

114001–114100 

|-bgcolor=#E9E9E9
| 114001 ||  || — || October 31, 2002 || Palomar || NEAT || — || align=right | 4.1 km || 
|-id=002 bgcolor=#fefefe
| 114002 ||  || — || October 31, 2002 || Kvistaberg || UDAS || FLO || align=right | 1.5 km || 
|-id=003 bgcolor=#d6d6d6
| 114003 ||  || — || October 31, 2002 || Socorro || LINEAR || — || align=right | 3.9 km || 
|-id=004 bgcolor=#fefefe
| 114004 ||  || — || October 31, 2002 || Anderson Mesa || LONEOS || — || align=right | 1.0 km || 
|-id=005 bgcolor=#d6d6d6
| 114005 ||  || — || October 31, 2002 || Anderson Mesa || LONEOS || — || align=right | 4.5 km || 
|-id=006 bgcolor=#d6d6d6
| 114006 ||  || — || October 31, 2002 || Anderson Mesa || LONEOS || — || align=right | 4.6 km || 
|-id=007 bgcolor=#d6d6d6
| 114007 ||  || — || October 31, 2002 || Anderson Mesa || LONEOS || 7:4 || align=right | 8.3 km || 
|-id=008 bgcolor=#fefefe
| 114008 ||  || — || October 31, 2002 || Palomar || NEAT || — || align=right | 1.8 km || 
|-id=009 bgcolor=#fefefe
| 114009 ||  || — || October 31, 2002 || Palomar || NEAT || FLO || align=right | 1.1 km || 
|-id=010 bgcolor=#E9E9E9
| 114010 ||  || — || October 31, 2002 || Socorro || LINEAR || — || align=right | 4.3 km || 
|-id=011 bgcolor=#E9E9E9
| 114011 ||  || — || October 31, 2002 || Socorro || LINEAR || — || align=right | 4.7 km || 
|-id=012 bgcolor=#d6d6d6
| 114012 ||  || — || October 31, 2002 || Socorro || LINEAR || — || align=right | 6.0 km || 
|-id=013 bgcolor=#d6d6d6
| 114013 ||  || — || October 31, 2002 || Socorro || LINEAR || TEL || align=right | 3.3 km || 
|-id=014 bgcolor=#d6d6d6
| 114014 ||  || — || October 31, 2002 || Socorro || LINEAR || EOS || align=right | 3.6 km || 
|-id=015 bgcolor=#fefefe
| 114015 ||  || — || October 31, 2002 || Anderson Mesa || LONEOS || — || align=right | 1.8 km || 
|-id=016 bgcolor=#d6d6d6
| 114016 ||  || — || October 31, 2002 || Palomar || NEAT || — || align=right | 5.4 km || 
|-id=017 bgcolor=#d6d6d6
| 114017 ||  || — || October 31, 2002 || Palomar || NEAT || — || align=right | 4.3 km || 
|-id=018 bgcolor=#d6d6d6
| 114018 ||  || — || October 30, 2002 || Kitt Peak || Spacewatch || — || align=right | 4.7 km || 
|-id=019 bgcolor=#d6d6d6
| 114019 ||  || — || October 31, 2002 || Socorro || LINEAR || EOS || align=right | 4.2 km || 
|-id=020 bgcolor=#d6d6d6
| 114020 ||  || — || October 31, 2002 || Socorro || LINEAR || — || align=right | 6.1 km || 
|-id=021 bgcolor=#fefefe
| 114021 ||  || — || October 31, 2002 || Anderson Mesa || LONEOS || — || align=right | 1.1 km || 
|-id=022 bgcolor=#E9E9E9
| 114022 Bizyaev ||  ||  || October 29, 2002 || Apache Point || SDSS || — || align=right | 2.9 km || 
|-id=023 bgcolor=#E9E9E9
| 114023 Harvanek ||  ||  || October 29, 2002 || Apache Point || SDSS || MAR || align=right | 2.0 km || 
|-id=024 bgcolor=#E9E9E9
| 114024 Scotkleinman ||  ||  || October 30, 2002 || Apache Point || SDSS || GEF || align=right | 2.0 km || 
|-id=025 bgcolor=#E9E9E9
| 114025 Krzesinski ||  ||  || October 30, 2002 || Apache Point || SDSS || — || align=right | 4.7 km || 
|-id=026 bgcolor=#d6d6d6
| 114026 Emalanushenko ||  ||  || October 30, 2002 || Apache Point || SDSS || — || align=right | 4.3 km || 
|-id=027 bgcolor=#E9E9E9
| 114027 Malanushenko ||  ||  || October 30, 2002 || Apache Point || SDSS || — || align=right | 3.8 km || 
|-id=028 bgcolor=#E9E9E9
| 114028 ||  || — || November 1, 2002 || Palomar || NEAT || — || align=right | 2.7 km || 
|-id=029 bgcolor=#fefefe
| 114029 ||  || — || November 1, 2002 || Palomar || NEAT || — || align=right | 1.6 km || 
|-id=030 bgcolor=#d6d6d6
| 114030 ||  || — || November 2, 2002 || Kvistaberg || UDAS || — || align=right | 6.0 km || 
|-id=031 bgcolor=#E9E9E9
| 114031 ||  || — || November 4, 2002 || Haleakala || NEAT || — || align=right | 4.2 km || 
|-id=032 bgcolor=#E9E9E9
| 114032 ||  || — || November 4, 2002 || Haleakala || NEAT || — || align=right | 1.8 km || 
|-id=033 bgcolor=#d6d6d6
| 114033 ||  || — || November 1, 2002 || Palomar || NEAT || — || align=right | 4.9 km || 
|-id=034 bgcolor=#fefefe
| 114034 ||  || — || November 1, 2002 || Palomar || NEAT || — || align=right | 1.6 km || 
|-id=035 bgcolor=#d6d6d6
| 114035 ||  || — || November 1, 2002 || Palomar || NEAT || — || align=right | 6.8 km || 
|-id=036 bgcolor=#d6d6d6
| 114036 ||  || — || November 1, 2002 || Palomar || NEAT || — || align=right | 5.4 km || 
|-id=037 bgcolor=#fefefe
| 114037 ||  || — || November 1, 2002 || Palomar || NEAT || — || align=right | 1.9 km || 
|-id=038 bgcolor=#fefefe
| 114038 ||  || — || November 1, 2002 || Palomar || NEAT || — || align=right | 1.7 km || 
|-id=039 bgcolor=#fefefe
| 114039 ||  || — || November 1, 2002 || Palomar || NEAT || V || align=right | 1.3 km || 
|-id=040 bgcolor=#fefefe
| 114040 ||  || — || November 1, 2002 || Palomar || NEAT || NYS || align=right | 1.3 km || 
|-id=041 bgcolor=#fefefe
| 114041 ||  || — || November 1, 2002 || Palomar || NEAT || — || align=right | 1.8 km || 
|-id=042 bgcolor=#fefefe
| 114042 ||  || — || November 1, 2002 || Palomar || NEAT || — || align=right | 3.3 km || 
|-id=043 bgcolor=#d6d6d6
| 114043 ||  || — || November 4, 2002 || Anderson Mesa || LONEOS || HYG || align=right | 5.2 km || 
|-id=044 bgcolor=#d6d6d6
| 114044 ||  || — || November 6, 2002 || Needville || Needville Obs. || HYG || align=right | 5.5 km || 
|-id=045 bgcolor=#fefefe
| 114045 ||  || — || November 5, 2002 || Anderson Mesa || LONEOS || — || align=right | 1.3 km || 
|-id=046 bgcolor=#d6d6d6
| 114046 ||  || — || November 5, 2002 || Socorro || LINEAR || — || align=right | 3.3 km || 
|-id=047 bgcolor=#E9E9E9
| 114047 ||  || — || November 5, 2002 || Socorro || LINEAR || — || align=right | 5.3 km || 
|-id=048 bgcolor=#fefefe
| 114048 ||  || — || November 5, 2002 || Socorro || LINEAR || ERI || align=right | 6.1 km || 
|-id=049 bgcolor=#E9E9E9
| 114049 ||  || — || November 5, 2002 || Socorro || LINEAR || — || align=right | 2.5 km || 
|-id=050 bgcolor=#d6d6d6
| 114050 ||  || — || November 4, 2002 || Anderson Mesa || LONEOS || — || align=right | 5.7 km || 
|-id=051 bgcolor=#E9E9E9
| 114051 ||  || — || November 4, 2002 || Palomar || NEAT || — || align=right | 3.4 km || 
|-id=052 bgcolor=#E9E9E9
| 114052 ||  || — || November 4, 2002 || Palomar || NEAT || — || align=right | 3.9 km || 
|-id=053 bgcolor=#fefefe
| 114053 ||  || — || November 4, 2002 || Palomar || NEAT || V || align=right | 1.3 km || 
|-id=054 bgcolor=#d6d6d6
| 114054 ||  || — || November 4, 2002 || Kitt Peak || Spacewatch || — || align=right | 3.4 km || 
|-id=055 bgcolor=#fefefe
| 114055 ||  || — || November 4, 2002 || Haleakala || NEAT || FLO || align=right | 1.0 km || 
|-id=056 bgcolor=#fefefe
| 114056 ||  || — || November 5, 2002 || Socorro || LINEAR || FLO || align=right | 1.3 km || 
|-id=057 bgcolor=#fefefe
| 114057 ||  || — || November 5, 2002 || Socorro || LINEAR || V || align=right | 1.3 km || 
|-id=058 bgcolor=#fefefe
| 114058 ||  || — || November 5, 2002 || Socorro || LINEAR || — || align=right | 1.5 km || 
|-id=059 bgcolor=#fefefe
| 114059 ||  || — || November 5, 2002 || Socorro || LINEAR || FLO || align=right | 1.6 km || 
|-id=060 bgcolor=#fefefe
| 114060 ||  || — || November 5, 2002 || Socorro || LINEAR || — || align=right | 1.3 km || 
|-id=061 bgcolor=#E9E9E9
| 114061 ||  || — || November 5, 2002 || Socorro || LINEAR || — || align=right | 5.3 km || 
|-id=062 bgcolor=#fefefe
| 114062 ||  || — || November 5, 2002 || Socorro || LINEAR || — || align=right | 1.8 km || 
|-id=063 bgcolor=#d6d6d6
| 114063 ||  || — || November 5, 2002 || Socorro || LINEAR || HYG || align=right | 6.3 km || 
|-id=064 bgcolor=#fefefe
| 114064 ||  || — || November 5, 2002 || Socorro || LINEAR || — || align=right | 1.7 km || 
|-id=065 bgcolor=#E9E9E9
| 114065 ||  || — || November 5, 2002 || Socorro || LINEAR || — || align=right | 5.3 km || 
|-id=066 bgcolor=#d6d6d6
| 114066 ||  || — || November 5, 2002 || Anderson Mesa || LONEOS || — || align=right | 5.1 km || 
|-id=067 bgcolor=#d6d6d6
| 114067 ||  || — || November 5, 2002 || Anderson Mesa || LONEOS || HYG || align=right | 4.6 km || 
|-id=068 bgcolor=#E9E9E9
| 114068 ||  || — || November 5, 2002 || Socorro || LINEAR || — || align=right | 2.5 km || 
|-id=069 bgcolor=#fefefe
| 114069 ||  || — || November 5, 2002 || Socorro || LINEAR || — || align=right | 3.9 km || 
|-id=070 bgcolor=#fefefe
| 114070 ||  || — || November 5, 2002 || Socorro || LINEAR || FLO || align=right | 1.2 km || 
|-id=071 bgcolor=#fefefe
| 114071 ||  || — || November 5, 2002 || Socorro || LINEAR || V || align=right | 1.5 km || 
|-id=072 bgcolor=#d6d6d6
| 114072 ||  || — || November 5, 2002 || Socorro || LINEAR || HYG || align=right | 7.1 km || 
|-id=073 bgcolor=#fefefe
| 114073 ||  || — || November 5, 2002 || Socorro || LINEAR || FLO || align=right | 3.6 km || 
|-id=074 bgcolor=#d6d6d6
| 114074 ||  || — || November 5, 2002 || Socorro || LINEAR || THM || align=right | 4.3 km || 
|-id=075 bgcolor=#fefefe
| 114075 ||  || — || November 5, 2002 || Socorro || LINEAR || — || align=right | 1.2 km || 
|-id=076 bgcolor=#fefefe
| 114076 ||  || — || November 5, 2002 || Socorro || LINEAR || — || align=right | 2.7 km || 
|-id=077 bgcolor=#fefefe
| 114077 ||  || — || November 5, 2002 || Socorro || LINEAR || — || align=right | 1.6 km || 
|-id=078 bgcolor=#E9E9E9
| 114078 ||  || — || November 5, 2002 || Socorro || LINEAR || MAR || align=right | 2.3 km || 
|-id=079 bgcolor=#d6d6d6
| 114079 ||  || — || November 5, 2002 || Socorro || LINEAR || — || align=right | 5.9 km || 
|-id=080 bgcolor=#E9E9E9
| 114080 ||  || — || November 5, 2002 || Socorro || LINEAR || — || align=right | 5.7 km || 
|-id=081 bgcolor=#fefefe
| 114081 ||  || — || November 5, 2002 || Socorro || LINEAR || — || align=right | 1.8 km || 
|-id=082 bgcolor=#E9E9E9
| 114082 ||  || — || November 5, 2002 || Socorro || LINEAR || ADE || align=right | 4.7 km || 
|-id=083 bgcolor=#d6d6d6
| 114083 ||  || — || November 5, 2002 || Kitt Peak || Spacewatch || — || align=right | 6.9 km || 
|-id=084 bgcolor=#d6d6d6
| 114084 ||  || — || November 5, 2002 || Socorro || LINEAR || KOR || align=right | 3.2 km || 
|-id=085 bgcolor=#fefefe
| 114085 ||  || — || November 5, 2002 || Socorro || LINEAR || — || align=right | 1.6 km || 
|-id=086 bgcolor=#E9E9E9
| 114086 ||  || — || November 5, 2002 || Socorro || LINEAR || — || align=right | 3.2 km || 
|-id=087 bgcolor=#fefefe
| 114087 ||  || — || November 5, 2002 || Socorro || LINEAR || — || align=right | 1.7 km || 
|-id=088 bgcolor=#fefefe
| 114088 ||  || — || November 5, 2002 || Anderson Mesa || LONEOS || — || align=right | 1.1 km || 
|-id=089 bgcolor=#fefefe
| 114089 ||  || — || November 5, 2002 || Socorro || LINEAR || V || align=right | 1.7 km || 
|-id=090 bgcolor=#fefefe
| 114090 ||  || — || November 5, 2002 || Socorro || LINEAR || FLO || align=right data-sort-value="0.93" | 930 m || 
|-id=091 bgcolor=#E9E9E9
| 114091 ||  || — || November 5, 2002 || Socorro || LINEAR || — || align=right | 3.0 km || 
|-id=092 bgcolor=#d6d6d6
| 114092 ||  || — || November 5, 2002 || Socorro || LINEAR || — || align=right | 6.3 km || 
|-id=093 bgcolor=#fefefe
| 114093 ||  || — || November 5, 2002 || Socorro || LINEAR || V || align=right | 1.7 km || 
|-id=094 bgcolor=#d6d6d6
| 114094 Irvpatterson ||  ||  || November 6, 2002 || Kingsnake || J. V. McClusky || VER || align=right | 5.8 km || 
|-id=095 bgcolor=#E9E9E9
| 114095 ||  || — || November 6, 2002 || Socorro || LINEAR || — || align=right | 4.8 km || 
|-id=096 bgcolor=#fefefe
| 114096 Haroldbier ||  ||  || November 8, 2002 || Kingsnake || J. V. McClusky || FLO || align=right | 1.1 km || 
|-id=097 bgcolor=#fefefe
| 114097 ||  || — || November 8, 2002 || Kingsnake || J. V. McClusky || PHO || align=right | 2.4 km || 
|-id=098 bgcolor=#fefefe
| 114098 ||  || — || November 5, 2002 || Socorro || LINEAR || — || align=right | 2.0 km || 
|-id=099 bgcolor=#fefefe
| 114099 ||  || — || November 5, 2002 || Haleakala || NEAT || — || align=right | 1.6 km || 
|-id=100 bgcolor=#E9E9E9
| 114100 ||  || — || November 4, 2002 || Palomar || NEAT || — || align=right | 2.0 km || 
|}

114101–114200 

|-bgcolor=#fefefe
| 114101 ||  || — || November 5, 2002 || Palomar || NEAT || NYS || align=right | 1.3 km || 
|-id=102 bgcolor=#d6d6d6
| 114102 ||  || — || November 5, 2002 || Palomar || NEAT || EOS || align=right | 3.4 km || 
|-id=103 bgcolor=#fefefe
| 114103 ||  || — || November 5, 2002 || Palomar || NEAT || V || align=right | 1.5 km || 
|-id=104 bgcolor=#fefefe
| 114104 ||  || — || November 5, 2002 || Palomar || NEAT || — || align=right | 1.4 km || 
|-id=105 bgcolor=#d6d6d6
| 114105 ||  || — || November 6, 2002 || Socorro || LINEAR || — || align=right | 5.0 km || 
|-id=106 bgcolor=#d6d6d6
| 114106 ||  || — || November 4, 2002 || Kitt Peak || Spacewatch || — || align=right | 3.0 km || 
|-id=107 bgcolor=#E9E9E9
| 114107 ||  || — || November 4, 2002 || Haleakala || NEAT || AER || align=right | 2.3 km || 
|-id=108 bgcolor=#E9E9E9
| 114108 ||  || — || November 4, 2002 || Haleakala || NEAT || NEM || align=right | 5.6 km || 
|-id=109 bgcolor=#E9E9E9
| 114109 ||  || — || November 5, 2002 || Palomar || NEAT || — || align=right | 2.8 km || 
|-id=110 bgcolor=#E9E9E9
| 114110 ||  || — || November 5, 2002 || Anderson Mesa || LONEOS || — || align=right | 3.3 km || 
|-id=111 bgcolor=#fefefe
| 114111 ||  || — || November 5, 2002 || Anderson Mesa || LONEOS || — || align=right | 1.5 km || 
|-id=112 bgcolor=#fefefe
| 114112 ||  || — || November 5, 2002 || Socorro || LINEAR || — || align=right | 1.5 km || 
|-id=113 bgcolor=#fefefe
| 114113 ||  || — || November 5, 2002 || Socorro || LINEAR || V || align=right | 1.3 km || 
|-id=114 bgcolor=#d6d6d6
| 114114 ||  || — || November 5, 2002 || Socorro || LINEAR || — || align=right | 8.4 km || 
|-id=115 bgcolor=#E9E9E9
| 114115 ||  || — || November 5, 2002 || Socorro || LINEAR || — || align=right | 2.1 km || 
|-id=116 bgcolor=#E9E9E9
| 114116 ||  || — || November 5, 2002 || Anderson Mesa || LONEOS || HEN || align=right | 1.9 km || 
|-id=117 bgcolor=#d6d6d6
| 114117 ||  || — || November 5, 2002 || Anderson Mesa || LONEOS || — || align=right | 5.3 km || 
|-id=118 bgcolor=#fefefe
| 114118 ||  || — || November 5, 2002 || Anderson Mesa || LONEOS || FLO || align=right | 1.2 km || 
|-id=119 bgcolor=#fefefe
| 114119 ||  || — || November 5, 2002 || Anderson Mesa || LONEOS || V || align=right | 1.6 km || 
|-id=120 bgcolor=#d6d6d6
| 114120 ||  || — || November 5, 2002 || Anderson Mesa || LONEOS || — || align=right | 7.7 km || 
|-id=121 bgcolor=#fefefe
| 114121 ||  || — || November 5, 2002 || Anderson Mesa || LONEOS || — || align=right | 2.0 km || 
|-id=122 bgcolor=#fefefe
| 114122 ||  || — || November 5, 2002 || Anderson Mesa || LONEOS || FLO || align=right | 1.2 km || 
|-id=123 bgcolor=#E9E9E9
| 114123 ||  || — || November 5, 2002 || Anderson Mesa || LONEOS || — || align=right | 2.2 km || 
|-id=124 bgcolor=#d6d6d6
| 114124 ||  || — || November 5, 2002 || Anderson Mesa || LONEOS || — || align=right | 3.7 km || 
|-id=125 bgcolor=#fefefe
| 114125 ||  || — || November 5, 2002 || Anderson Mesa || LONEOS || — || align=right | 1.5 km || 
|-id=126 bgcolor=#fefefe
| 114126 ||  || — || November 5, 2002 || Anderson Mesa || LONEOS || FLO || align=right | 1.4 km || 
|-id=127 bgcolor=#fefefe
| 114127 ||  || — || November 5, 2002 || Anderson Mesa || LONEOS || FLO || align=right | 2.3 km || 
|-id=128 bgcolor=#E9E9E9
| 114128 ||  || — || November 6, 2002 || Anderson Mesa || LONEOS || — || align=right | 3.9 km || 
|-id=129 bgcolor=#E9E9E9
| 114129 ||  || — || November 6, 2002 || Anderson Mesa || LONEOS || — || align=right | 2.6 km || 
|-id=130 bgcolor=#fefefe
| 114130 ||  || — || November 6, 2002 || Socorro || LINEAR || — || align=right | 1.3 km || 
|-id=131 bgcolor=#d6d6d6
| 114131 ||  || — || November 6, 2002 || Socorro || LINEAR || 628 || align=right | 3.3 km || 
|-id=132 bgcolor=#d6d6d6
| 114132 ||  || — || November 6, 2002 || Socorro || LINEAR || KOR || align=right | 2.9 km || 
|-id=133 bgcolor=#fefefe
| 114133 ||  || — || November 6, 2002 || Socorro || LINEAR || — || align=right | 1.7 km || 
|-id=134 bgcolor=#fefefe
| 114134 ||  || — || November 6, 2002 || Socorro || LINEAR || MAS || align=right | 1.3 km || 
|-id=135 bgcolor=#d6d6d6
| 114135 ||  || — || November 6, 2002 || Anderson Mesa || LONEOS || — || align=right | 4.3 km || 
|-id=136 bgcolor=#d6d6d6
| 114136 ||  || — || November 6, 2002 || Socorro || LINEAR || ALA || align=right | 8.8 km || 
|-id=137 bgcolor=#fefefe
| 114137 ||  || — || November 6, 2002 || Haleakala || NEAT || FLO || align=right | 1.4 km || 
|-id=138 bgcolor=#E9E9E9
| 114138 ||  || — || November 6, 2002 || Haleakala || NEAT || — || align=right | 6.8 km || 
|-id=139 bgcolor=#fefefe
| 114139 ||  || — || November 7, 2002 || Socorro || LINEAR || — || align=right | 4.2 km || 
|-id=140 bgcolor=#E9E9E9
| 114140 ||  || — || November 1, 2002 || Socorro || LINEAR || GEF || align=right | 2.5 km || 
|-id=141 bgcolor=#C2FFFF
| 114141 ||  || — || November 4, 2002 || Haleakala || NEAT || L5 || align=right | 21 km || 
|-id=142 bgcolor=#fefefe
| 114142 ||  || — || November 5, 2002 || Socorro || LINEAR || FLO || align=right | 1.1 km || 
|-id=143 bgcolor=#d6d6d6
| 114143 ||  || — || November 5, 2002 || Socorro || LINEAR || — || align=right | 5.4 km || 
|-id=144 bgcolor=#fefefe
| 114144 ||  || — || November 5, 2002 || Socorro || LINEAR || FLO || align=right | 1.0 km || 
|-id=145 bgcolor=#E9E9E9
| 114145 ||  || — || November 5, 2002 || Anderson Mesa || LONEOS || HOF || align=right | 5.2 km || 
|-id=146 bgcolor=#fefefe
| 114146 ||  || — || November 5, 2002 || Anderson Mesa || LONEOS || V || align=right | 1.6 km || 
|-id=147 bgcolor=#fefefe
| 114147 ||  || — || November 6, 2002 || Anderson Mesa || LONEOS || — || align=right | 1.8 km || 
|-id=148 bgcolor=#E9E9E9
| 114148 ||  || — || November 6, 2002 || Anderson Mesa || LONEOS || MAR || align=right | 2.3 km || 
|-id=149 bgcolor=#fefefe
| 114149 ||  || — || November 6, 2002 || Socorro || LINEAR || — || align=right | 2.3 km || 
|-id=150 bgcolor=#E9E9E9
| 114150 ||  || — || November 7, 2002 || Anderson Mesa || LONEOS || EUN || align=right | 2.6 km || 
|-id=151 bgcolor=#d6d6d6
| 114151 ||  || — || November 7, 2002 || Socorro || LINEAR || TIR || align=right | 5.1 km || 
|-id=152 bgcolor=#E9E9E9
| 114152 ||  || — || November 7, 2002 || Socorro || LINEAR || — || align=right | 4.0 km || 
|-id=153 bgcolor=#fefefe
| 114153 ||  || — || November 7, 2002 || Kingsnake || J. V. McClusky || — || align=right | 1.4 km || 
|-id=154 bgcolor=#fefefe
| 114154 ||  || — || November 6, 2002 || Socorro || LINEAR || NYS || align=right | 1.7 km || 
|-id=155 bgcolor=#fefefe
| 114155 ||  || — || November 7, 2002 || Socorro || LINEAR || Vfast? || align=right | 1.1 km || 
|-id=156 bgcolor=#d6d6d6
| 114156 Eamonlittle ||  ||  || November 4, 2002 || La Palma || A. Fitzsimmons, I. P. Williams || — || align=right | 3.8 km || 
|-id=157 bgcolor=#d6d6d6
| 114157 ||  || — || November 7, 2002 || Socorro || LINEAR || — || align=right | 3.9 km || 
|-id=158 bgcolor=#fefefe
| 114158 ||  || — || November 7, 2002 || Socorro || LINEAR || — || align=right | 1.5 km || 
|-id=159 bgcolor=#fefefe
| 114159 ||  || — || November 7, 2002 || Socorro || LINEAR || — || align=right | 1.7 km || 
|-id=160 bgcolor=#E9E9E9
| 114160 ||  || — || November 7, 2002 || Socorro || LINEAR || — || align=right | 4.5 km || 
|-id=161 bgcolor=#d6d6d6
| 114161 ||  || — || November 7, 2002 || Socorro || LINEAR || — || align=right | 3.7 km || 
|-id=162 bgcolor=#d6d6d6
| 114162 ||  || — || November 7, 2002 || Socorro || LINEAR || HYG || align=right | 7.0 km || 
|-id=163 bgcolor=#fefefe
| 114163 ||  || — || November 7, 2002 || Socorro || LINEAR || — || align=right | 1.2 km || 
|-id=164 bgcolor=#E9E9E9
| 114164 ||  || — || November 7, 2002 || Socorro || LINEAR || — || align=right | 3.6 km || 
|-id=165 bgcolor=#E9E9E9
| 114165 ||  || — || November 7, 2002 || Socorro || LINEAR || — || align=right | 2.8 km || 
|-id=166 bgcolor=#E9E9E9
| 114166 ||  || — || November 7, 2002 || Socorro || LINEAR || NEM || align=right | 5.6 km || 
|-id=167 bgcolor=#E9E9E9
| 114167 ||  || — || November 7, 2002 || Socorro || LINEAR || — || align=right | 2.9 km || 
|-id=168 bgcolor=#fefefe
| 114168 ||  || — || November 7, 2002 || Socorro || LINEAR || V || align=right | 1.7 km || 
|-id=169 bgcolor=#E9E9E9
| 114169 ||  || — || November 7, 2002 || Socorro || LINEAR || — || align=right | 4.1 km || 
|-id=170 bgcolor=#fefefe
| 114170 ||  || — || November 7, 2002 || Socorro || LINEAR || V || align=right | 1.3 km || 
|-id=171 bgcolor=#E9E9E9
| 114171 ||  || — || November 7, 2002 || Socorro || LINEAR || — || align=right | 3.0 km || 
|-id=172 bgcolor=#d6d6d6
| 114172 ||  || — || November 7, 2002 || Socorro || LINEAR || URS || align=right | 6.8 km || 
|-id=173 bgcolor=#d6d6d6
| 114173 ||  || — || November 7, 2002 || Socorro || LINEAR || HYG || align=right | 4.1 km || 
|-id=174 bgcolor=#d6d6d6
| 114174 ||  || — || November 7, 2002 || Socorro || LINEAR || EOS || align=right | 3.5 km || 
|-id=175 bgcolor=#E9E9E9
| 114175 ||  || — || November 7, 2002 || Socorro || LINEAR || WIT || align=right | 2.0 km || 
|-id=176 bgcolor=#fefefe
| 114176 ||  || — || November 7, 2002 || Socorro || LINEAR || — || align=right | 2.9 km || 
|-id=177 bgcolor=#d6d6d6
| 114177 ||  || — || November 7, 2002 || Socorro || LINEAR || HYG || align=right | 5.1 km || 
|-id=178 bgcolor=#d6d6d6
| 114178 ||  || — || November 7, 2002 || Socorro || LINEAR || — || align=right | 5.2 km || 
|-id=179 bgcolor=#E9E9E9
| 114179 ||  || — || November 7, 2002 || Socorro || LINEAR || ADE || align=right | 5.7 km || 
|-id=180 bgcolor=#E9E9E9
| 114180 ||  || — || November 7, 2002 || Socorro || LINEAR || — || align=right | 3.3 km || 
|-id=181 bgcolor=#fefefe
| 114181 ||  || — || November 7, 2002 || Socorro || LINEAR || V || align=right | 1.5 km || 
|-id=182 bgcolor=#d6d6d6
| 114182 ||  || — || November 7, 2002 || Socorro || LINEAR || EOS || align=right | 3.9 km || 
|-id=183 bgcolor=#fefefe
| 114183 ||  || — || November 7, 2002 || Socorro || LINEAR || — || align=right | 3.0 km || 
|-id=184 bgcolor=#E9E9E9
| 114184 ||  || — || November 7, 2002 || Socorro || LINEAR || — || align=right | 2.3 km || 
|-id=185 bgcolor=#fefefe
| 114185 ||  || — || November 7, 2002 || Socorro || LINEAR || — || align=right | 1.8 km || 
|-id=186 bgcolor=#E9E9E9
| 114186 ||  || — || November 7, 2002 || Socorro || LINEAR || — || align=right | 3.1 km || 
|-id=187 bgcolor=#d6d6d6
| 114187 ||  || — || November 7, 2002 || Socorro || LINEAR || ALA || align=right | 8.9 km || 
|-id=188 bgcolor=#fefefe
| 114188 ||  || — || November 7, 2002 || Socorro || LINEAR || FLO || align=right | 1.2 km || 
|-id=189 bgcolor=#E9E9E9
| 114189 ||  || — || November 7, 2002 || Socorro || LINEAR || — || align=right | 3.5 km || 
|-id=190 bgcolor=#d6d6d6
| 114190 ||  || — || November 7, 2002 || Socorro || LINEAR || EUP || align=right | 10 km || 
|-id=191 bgcolor=#E9E9E9
| 114191 ||  || — || November 11, 2002 || Socorro || LINEAR || — || align=right | 1.5 km || 
|-id=192 bgcolor=#fefefe
| 114192 ||  || — || November 11, 2002 || Socorro || LINEAR || — || align=right | 1.4 km || 
|-id=193 bgcolor=#E9E9E9
| 114193 ||  || — || November 11, 2002 || Socorro || LINEAR || EUN || align=right | 3.5 km || 
|-id=194 bgcolor=#d6d6d6
| 114194 ||  || — || November 11, 2002 || Socorro || LINEAR || — || align=right | 4.9 km || 
|-id=195 bgcolor=#fefefe
| 114195 ||  || — || November 12, 2002 || Socorro || LINEAR || — || align=right | 1.2 km || 
|-id=196 bgcolor=#d6d6d6
| 114196 ||  || — || November 11, 2002 || Anderson Mesa || LONEOS || — || align=right | 5.6 km || 
|-id=197 bgcolor=#E9E9E9
| 114197 ||  || — || November 11, 2002 || Socorro || LINEAR || — || align=right | 1.7 km || 
|-id=198 bgcolor=#E9E9E9
| 114198 ||  || — || November 12, 2002 || Socorro || LINEAR || — || align=right | 4.6 km || 
|-id=199 bgcolor=#fefefe
| 114199 ||  || — || November 12, 2002 || Socorro || LINEAR || — || align=right | 1.2 km || 
|-id=200 bgcolor=#fefefe
| 114200 ||  || — || November 11, 2002 || Socorro || LINEAR || — || align=right | 2.3 km || 
|}

114201–114300 

|-bgcolor=#E9E9E9
| 114201 ||  || — || November 13, 2002 || Socorro || LINEAR || — || align=right | 3.8 km || 
|-id=202 bgcolor=#E9E9E9
| 114202 ||  || — || November 10, 2002 || Socorro || LINEAR || HNS || align=right | 3.9 km || 
|-id=203 bgcolor=#fefefe
| 114203 ||  || — || November 11, 2002 || Socorro || LINEAR || — || align=right | 1.7 km || 
|-id=204 bgcolor=#E9E9E9
| 114204 ||  || — || November 12, 2002 || Socorro || LINEAR || MAR || align=right | 2.2 km || 
|-id=205 bgcolor=#E9E9E9
| 114205 ||  || — || November 12, 2002 || Socorro || LINEAR || — || align=right | 2.0 km || 
|-id=206 bgcolor=#fefefe
| 114206 ||  || — || November 12, 2002 || Socorro || LINEAR || V || align=right | 1.5 km || 
|-id=207 bgcolor=#fefefe
| 114207 ||  || — || November 12, 2002 || Socorro || LINEAR || — || align=right | 2.0 km || 
|-id=208 bgcolor=#C2FFFF
| 114208 ||  || — || November 12, 2002 || Socorro || LINEAR || L5 || align=right | 20 km || 
|-id=209 bgcolor=#E9E9E9
| 114209 ||  || — || November 12, 2002 || Socorro || LINEAR || — || align=right | 2.0 km || 
|-id=210 bgcolor=#E9E9E9
| 114210 ||  || — || November 12, 2002 || Socorro || LINEAR || — || align=right | 5.3 km || 
|-id=211 bgcolor=#E9E9E9
| 114211 ||  || — || November 12, 2002 || Socorro || LINEAR || — || align=right | 3.3 km || 
|-id=212 bgcolor=#fefefe
| 114212 ||  || — || November 12, 2002 || Socorro || LINEAR || — || align=right | 2.2 km || 
|-id=213 bgcolor=#fefefe
| 114213 ||  || — || November 12, 2002 || Socorro || LINEAR || V || align=right | 1.2 km || 
|-id=214 bgcolor=#E9E9E9
| 114214 ||  || — || November 12, 2002 || Socorro || LINEAR || — || align=right | 2.3 km || 
|-id=215 bgcolor=#fefefe
| 114215 ||  || — || November 12, 2002 || Socorro || LINEAR || — || align=right | 2.4 km || 
|-id=216 bgcolor=#d6d6d6
| 114216 ||  || — || November 13, 2002 || Palomar || NEAT || — || align=right | 4.1 km || 
|-id=217 bgcolor=#E9E9E9
| 114217 ||  || — || November 13, 2002 || Socorro || LINEAR || MAR || align=right | 3.0 km || 
|-id=218 bgcolor=#d6d6d6
| 114218 ||  || — || November 13, 2002 || Palomar || NEAT || — || align=right | 4.7 km || 
|-id=219 bgcolor=#fefefe
| 114219 ||  || — || November 13, 2002 || Palomar || NEAT || — || align=right | 1.1 km || 
|-id=220 bgcolor=#fefefe
| 114220 ||  || — || November 13, 2002 || Socorro || LINEAR || V || align=right | 1.2 km || 
|-id=221 bgcolor=#E9E9E9
| 114221 ||  || — || November 13, 2002 || Palomar || NEAT || — || align=right | 4.4 km || 
|-id=222 bgcolor=#fefefe
| 114222 ||  || — || November 13, 2002 || Palomar || NEAT || FLO || align=right | 1.5 km || 
|-id=223 bgcolor=#d6d6d6
| 114223 ||  || — || November 13, 2002 || Palomar || NEAT || — || align=right | 5.2 km || 
|-id=224 bgcolor=#fefefe
| 114224 ||  || — || November 13, 2002 || Palomar || NEAT || — || align=right | 1.5 km || 
|-id=225 bgcolor=#d6d6d6
| 114225 ||  || — || November 13, 2002 || Palomar || NEAT || HYG || align=right | 4.8 km || 
|-id=226 bgcolor=#E9E9E9
| 114226 ||  || — || November 11, 2002 || Socorro || LINEAR || — || align=right | 2.2 km || 
|-id=227 bgcolor=#fefefe
| 114227 ||  || — || November 12, 2002 || Socorro || LINEAR || V || align=right | 1.6 km || 
|-id=228 bgcolor=#d6d6d6
| 114228 ||  || — || November 13, 2002 || Palomar || NEAT || — || align=right | 3.6 km || 
|-id=229 bgcolor=#E9E9E9
| 114229 ||  || — || November 13, 2002 || Socorro || LINEAR || — || align=right | 5.6 km || 
|-id=230 bgcolor=#fefefe
| 114230 ||  || — || November 12, 2002 || Socorro || LINEAR || V || align=right | 1.3 km || 
|-id=231 bgcolor=#E9E9E9
| 114231 ||  || — || November 13, 2002 || Kitt Peak || Spacewatch || GER || align=right | 3.7 km || 
|-id=232 bgcolor=#E9E9E9
| 114232 ||  || — || November 14, 2002 || Socorro || LINEAR || — || align=right | 2.0 km || 
|-id=233 bgcolor=#fefefe
| 114233 ||  || — || November 14, 2002 || Palomar || NEAT || — || align=right | 1.7 km || 
|-id=234 bgcolor=#d6d6d6
| 114234 ||  || — || November 11, 2002 || Socorro || LINEAR || — || align=right | 4.4 km || 
|-id=235 bgcolor=#fefefe
| 114235 ||  || — || November 6, 2002 || Anderson Mesa || LONEOS || fast? || align=right | 1.7 km || 
|-id=236 bgcolor=#d6d6d6
| 114236 ||  || — || November 6, 2002 || Anderson Mesa || LONEOS || — || align=right | 7.0 km || 
|-id=237 bgcolor=#d6d6d6
| 114237 ||  || — || November 7, 2002 || Socorro || LINEAR || ALA || align=right | 7.9 km || 
|-id=238 bgcolor=#E9E9E9
| 114238 || 2002 WC || — || November 16, 2002 || Socorro || LINEAR || HNS || align=right | 3.6 km || 
|-id=239 bgcolor=#E9E9E9
| 114239 Bermarmi || 2002 WN ||  || November 21, 2002 || Wrightwood || J. W. Young || EUN || align=right | 2.5 km || 
|-id=240 bgcolor=#fefefe
| 114240 ||  || — || November 24, 2002 || Palomar || NEAT || V || align=right | 1.3 km || 
|-id=241 bgcolor=#d6d6d6
| 114241 ||  || — || November 24, 2002 || Palomar || NEAT || — || align=right | 4.6 km || 
|-id=242 bgcolor=#d6d6d6
| 114242 ||  || — || November 23, 2002 || Palomar || NEAT || — || align=right | 6.3 km || 
|-id=243 bgcolor=#d6d6d6
| 114243 ||  || — || November 24, 2002 || Palomar || NEAT || — || align=right | 9.1 km || 
|-id=244 bgcolor=#E9E9E9
| 114244 ||  || — || November 24, 2002 || Palomar || NEAT || — || align=right | 5.9 km || 
|-id=245 bgcolor=#d6d6d6
| 114245 ||  || — || November 24, 2002 || Palomar || NEAT || EOS || align=right | 3.4 km || 
|-id=246 bgcolor=#fefefe
| 114246 ||  || — || November 24, 2002 || Palomar || NEAT || — || align=right | 1.4 km || 
|-id=247 bgcolor=#fefefe
| 114247 ||  || — || November 25, 2002 || Palomar || NEAT || V || align=right | 1.2 km || 
|-id=248 bgcolor=#d6d6d6
| 114248 ||  || — || November 26, 2002 || Kitt Peak || Spacewatch || — || align=right | 6.5 km || 
|-id=249 bgcolor=#FA8072
| 114249 ||  || — || November 24, 2002 || Palomar || NEAT || — || align=right | 2.7 km || 
|-id=250 bgcolor=#fefefe
| 114250 ||  || — || November 28, 2002 || Anderson Mesa || LONEOS || — || align=right | 1.4 km || 
|-id=251 bgcolor=#d6d6d6
| 114251 ||  || — || November 28, 2002 || Anderson Mesa || LONEOS || — || align=right | 5.2 km || 
|-id=252 bgcolor=#fefefe
| 114252 ||  || — || November 28, 2002 || Anderson Mesa || LONEOS || — || align=right | 1.5 km || 
|-id=253 bgcolor=#E9E9E9
| 114253 ||  || — || November 28, 2002 || Anderson Mesa || LONEOS || MAR || align=right | 2.5 km || 
|-id=254 bgcolor=#E9E9E9
| 114254 ||  || — || November 28, 2002 || Haleakala || NEAT || AGN || align=right | 2.5 km || 
|-id=255 bgcolor=#E9E9E9
| 114255 ||  || — || November 28, 2002 || Haleakala || NEAT || — || align=right | 5.1 km || 
|-id=256 bgcolor=#d6d6d6
| 114256 ||  || — || November 28, 2002 || Haleakala || NEAT || — || align=right | 5.1 km || 
|-id=257 bgcolor=#fefefe
| 114257 ||  || — || November 28, 2002 || Haleakala || NEAT || — || align=right | 1.8 km || 
|-id=258 bgcolor=#fefefe
| 114258 ||  || — || November 28, 2002 || Haleakala || NEAT || V || align=right | 1.6 km || 
|-id=259 bgcolor=#d6d6d6
| 114259 ||  || — || November 28, 2002 || Haleakala || NEAT || EOS || align=right | 3.7 km || 
|-id=260 bgcolor=#d6d6d6
| 114260 ||  || — || November 28, 2002 || Haleakala || NEAT || — || align=right | 5.8 km || 
|-id=261 bgcolor=#E9E9E9
| 114261 ||  || — || November 28, 2002 || Haleakala || NEAT || EUN || align=right | 2.6 km || 
|-id=262 bgcolor=#E9E9E9
| 114262 || 2002 XH || — || December 1, 2002 || Socorro || LINEAR || GEF || align=right | 2.6 km || 
|-id=263 bgcolor=#E9E9E9
| 114263 ||  || — || December 1, 2002 || Socorro || LINEAR || — || align=right | 1.9 km || 
|-id=264 bgcolor=#fefefe
| 114264 ||  || — || December 1, 2002 || Socorro || LINEAR || NYS || align=right | 1.3 km || 
|-id=265 bgcolor=#E9E9E9
| 114265 ||  || — || December 1, 2002 || Socorro || LINEAR || — || align=right | 3.7 km || 
|-id=266 bgcolor=#d6d6d6
| 114266 ||  || — || December 1, 2002 || Socorro || LINEAR || — || align=right | 5.4 km || 
|-id=267 bgcolor=#fefefe
| 114267 ||  || — || December 1, 2002 || Socorro || LINEAR || — || align=right | 1.5 km || 
|-id=268 bgcolor=#d6d6d6
| 114268 ||  || — || December 1, 2002 || Socorro || LINEAR || — || align=right | 5.0 km || 
|-id=269 bgcolor=#d6d6d6
| 114269 ||  || — || December 1, 2002 || Socorro || LINEAR || — || align=right | 3.5 km || 
|-id=270 bgcolor=#fefefe
| 114270 ||  || — || December 1, 2002 || Haleakala || NEAT || — || align=right | 1.3 km || 
|-id=271 bgcolor=#fefefe
| 114271 ||  || — || December 2, 2002 || Socorro || LINEAR || — || align=right | 1.6 km || 
|-id=272 bgcolor=#d6d6d6
| 114272 ||  || — || December 3, 2002 || Palomar || NEAT || — || align=right | 4.1 km || 
|-id=273 bgcolor=#fefefe
| 114273 ||  || — || December 5, 2002 || Socorro || LINEAR || — || align=right | 1.3 km || 
|-id=274 bgcolor=#E9E9E9
| 114274 ||  || — || December 2, 2002 || Socorro || LINEAR || GEF || align=right | 2.3 km || 
|-id=275 bgcolor=#d6d6d6
| 114275 ||  || — || December 3, 2002 || Palomar || NEAT || — || align=right | 4.7 km || 
|-id=276 bgcolor=#fefefe
| 114276 ||  || — || December 5, 2002 || Socorro || LINEAR || — || align=right | 2.2 km || 
|-id=277 bgcolor=#d6d6d6
| 114277 ||  || — || December 5, 2002 || Socorro || LINEAR || — || align=right | 5.3 km || 
|-id=278 bgcolor=#d6d6d6
| 114278 ||  || — || December 5, 2002 || Socorro || LINEAR || — || align=right | 8.5 km || 
|-id=279 bgcolor=#d6d6d6
| 114279 ||  || — || December 2, 2002 || Socorro || LINEAR || — || align=right | 3.7 km || 
|-id=280 bgcolor=#fefefe
| 114280 ||  || — || December 2, 2002 || Socorro || LINEAR || — || align=right | 1.9 km || 
|-id=281 bgcolor=#fefefe
| 114281 ||  || — || December 2, 2002 || Socorro || LINEAR || V || align=right | 1.8 km || 
|-id=282 bgcolor=#fefefe
| 114282 ||  || — || December 5, 2002 || Socorro || LINEAR || — || align=right | 1.4 km || 
|-id=283 bgcolor=#E9E9E9
| 114283 ||  || — || December 5, 2002 || Socorro || LINEAR || — || align=right | 2.4 km || 
|-id=284 bgcolor=#fefefe
| 114284 ||  || — || December 5, 2002 || Socorro || LINEAR || — || align=right | 1.4 km || 
|-id=285 bgcolor=#E9E9E9
| 114285 ||  || — || December 5, 2002 || Socorro || LINEAR || — || align=right | 1.8 km || 
|-id=286 bgcolor=#E9E9E9
| 114286 ||  || — || December 5, 2002 || Socorro || LINEAR || — || align=right | 5.0 km || 
|-id=287 bgcolor=#E9E9E9
| 114287 ||  || — || December 5, 2002 || Socorro || LINEAR || — || align=right | 2.9 km || 
|-id=288 bgcolor=#fefefe
| 114288 ||  || — || December 5, 2002 || Socorro || LINEAR || — || align=right | 3.5 km || 
|-id=289 bgcolor=#fefefe
| 114289 ||  || — || December 5, 2002 || Fountain Hills || Fountain Hills Obs. || — || align=right | 1.9 km || 
|-id=290 bgcolor=#d6d6d6
| 114290 ||  || — || December 5, 2002 || Socorro || LINEAR || — || align=right | 4.2 km || 
|-id=291 bgcolor=#d6d6d6
| 114291 ||  || — || December 5, 2002 || Kitt Peak || Spacewatch || EOS || align=right | 3.9 km || 
|-id=292 bgcolor=#fefefe
| 114292 ||  || — || December 5, 2002 || Palomar || NEAT || V || align=right | 1.4 km || 
|-id=293 bgcolor=#d6d6d6
| 114293 ||  || — || December 5, 2002 || Socorro || LINEAR || — || align=right | 7.1 km || 
|-id=294 bgcolor=#E9E9E9
| 114294 ||  || — || December 5, 2002 || Socorro || LINEAR || — || align=right | 4.1 km || 
|-id=295 bgcolor=#d6d6d6
| 114295 ||  || — || December 6, 2002 || Socorro || LINEAR || — || align=right | 5.6 km || 
|-id=296 bgcolor=#d6d6d6
| 114296 ||  || — || December 6, 2002 || Socorro || LINEAR || — || align=right | 5.9 km || 
|-id=297 bgcolor=#fefefe
| 114297 ||  || — || December 6, 2002 || Socorro || LINEAR || V || align=right | 1.4 km || 
|-id=298 bgcolor=#fefefe
| 114298 ||  || — || December 5, 2002 || Socorro || LINEAR || — || align=right | 2.1 km || 
|-id=299 bgcolor=#fefefe
| 114299 ||  || — || December 9, 2002 || Tebbutt || F. B. Zoltowski || — || align=right | 2.0 km || 
|-id=300 bgcolor=#E9E9E9
| 114300 ||  || — || December 6, 2002 || Socorro || LINEAR || JUN || align=right | 2.3 km || 
|}

114301–114400 

|-bgcolor=#fefefe
| 114301 ||  || — || December 8, 2002 || Haleakala || NEAT || V || align=right | 1.4 km || 
|-id=302 bgcolor=#fefefe
| 114302 ||  || — || December 7, 2002 || Socorro || LINEAR || — || align=right | 1.7 km || 
|-id=303 bgcolor=#fefefe
| 114303 ||  || — || December 7, 2002 || Socorro || LINEAR || NYS || align=right | 1.2 km || 
|-id=304 bgcolor=#E9E9E9
| 114304 ||  || — || December 8, 2002 || Haleakala || NEAT || — || align=right | 2.4 km || 
|-id=305 bgcolor=#fefefe
| 114305 ||  || — || December 10, 2002 || Socorro || LINEAR || NYS || align=right | 1.3 km || 
|-id=306 bgcolor=#E9E9E9
| 114306 ||  || — || December 10, 2002 || Socorro || LINEAR || — || align=right | 4.5 km || 
|-id=307 bgcolor=#fefefe
| 114307 ||  || — || December 10, 2002 || Socorro || LINEAR || NYS || align=right | 1.3 km || 
|-id=308 bgcolor=#fefefe
| 114308 ||  || — || December 10, 2002 || Socorro || LINEAR || SUL || align=right | 4.3 km || 
|-id=309 bgcolor=#fefefe
| 114309 ||  || — || December 10, 2002 || Socorro || LINEAR || — || align=right | 1.3 km || 
|-id=310 bgcolor=#E9E9E9
| 114310 ||  || — || December 10, 2002 || Socorro || LINEAR || — || align=right | 5.2 km || 
|-id=311 bgcolor=#fefefe
| 114311 ||  || — || December 10, 2002 || Socorro || LINEAR || — || align=right | 1.8 km || 
|-id=312 bgcolor=#E9E9E9
| 114312 ||  || — || December 10, 2002 || Socorro || LINEAR || — || align=right | 2.1 km || 
|-id=313 bgcolor=#d6d6d6
| 114313 ||  || — || December 10, 2002 || Socorro || LINEAR || EOS || align=right | 3.8 km || 
|-id=314 bgcolor=#E9E9E9
| 114314 ||  || — || December 10, 2002 || Palomar || NEAT || — || align=right | 5.8 km || 
|-id=315 bgcolor=#d6d6d6
| 114315 ||  || — || December 8, 2002 || Haleakala || NEAT || — || align=right | 5.1 km || 
|-id=316 bgcolor=#fefefe
| 114316 ||  || — || December 10, 2002 || Socorro || LINEAR || — || align=right | 1.9 km || 
|-id=317 bgcolor=#E9E9E9
| 114317 ||  || — || December 10, 2002 || Palomar || NEAT || — || align=right | 2.3 km || 
|-id=318 bgcolor=#fefefe
| 114318 ||  || — || December 10, 2002 || Palomar || NEAT || V || align=right | 1.4 km || 
|-id=319 bgcolor=#FA8072
| 114319 ||  || — || December 11, 2002 || Socorro || LINEAR || moon || align=right | 1.7 km || 
|-id=320 bgcolor=#fefefe
| 114320 ||  || — || December 11, 2002 || Socorro || LINEAR || FLO || align=right | 1.2 km || 
|-id=321 bgcolor=#fefefe
| 114321 ||  || — || December 11, 2002 || Socorro || LINEAR || — || align=right | 1.8 km || 
|-id=322 bgcolor=#d6d6d6
| 114322 ||  || — || December 11, 2002 || Socorro || LINEAR || — || align=right | 6.0 km || 
|-id=323 bgcolor=#d6d6d6
| 114323 ||  || — || December 9, 2002 || Kitt Peak || Spacewatch || — || align=right | 4.3 km || 
|-id=324 bgcolor=#d6d6d6
| 114324 ||  || — || December 10, 2002 || Socorro || LINEAR || EOS || align=right | 3.1 km || 
|-id=325 bgcolor=#fefefe
| 114325 ||  || — || December 12, 2002 || Nogales || P. R. Holvorcem, M. Schwartz || V || align=right | 1.2 km || 
|-id=326 bgcolor=#FA8072
| 114326 ||  || — || December 11, 2002 || Socorro || LINEAR || — || align=right | 2.6 km || 
|-id=327 bgcolor=#fefefe
| 114327 ||  || — || December 11, 2002 || Socorro || LINEAR || — || align=right | 3.5 km || 
|-id=328 bgcolor=#fefefe
| 114328 ||  || — || December 11, 2002 || Socorro || LINEAR || NYS || align=right | 1.5 km || 
|-id=329 bgcolor=#fefefe
| 114329 ||  || — || December 11, 2002 || Socorro || LINEAR || NYS || align=right | 1.2 km || 
|-id=330 bgcolor=#fefefe
| 114330 ||  || — || December 11, 2002 || Socorro || LINEAR || — || align=right | 2.0 km || 
|-id=331 bgcolor=#fefefe
| 114331 ||  || — || December 11, 2002 || Socorro || LINEAR || V || align=right | 1.4 km || 
|-id=332 bgcolor=#fefefe
| 114332 ||  || — || December 11, 2002 || Socorro || LINEAR || V || align=right | 1.6 km || 
|-id=333 bgcolor=#d6d6d6
| 114333 ||  || — || December 12, 2002 || Socorro || LINEAR || — || align=right | 5.6 km || 
|-id=334 bgcolor=#E9E9E9
| 114334 ||  || — || December 12, 2002 || Socorro || LINEAR || HNSslow || align=right | 4.5 km || 
|-id=335 bgcolor=#fefefe
| 114335 ||  || — || December 12, 2002 || Socorro || LINEAR || PHO || align=right | 3.8 km || 
|-id=336 bgcolor=#fefefe
| 114336 ||  || — || December 10, 2002 || Socorro || LINEAR || V || align=right | 1.6 km || 
|-id=337 bgcolor=#E9E9E9
| 114337 ||  || — || December 11, 2002 || Palomar || NEAT || — || align=right | 4.4 km || 
|-id=338 bgcolor=#fefefe
| 114338 ||  || — || December 12, 2002 || Haleakala || NEAT || — || align=right | 1.5 km || 
|-id=339 bgcolor=#d6d6d6
| 114339 ||  || — || December 12, 2002 || Haleakala || NEAT || — || align=right | 6.9 km || 
|-id=340 bgcolor=#fefefe
| 114340 ||  || — || December 5, 2002 || Socorro || LINEAR || — || align=right | 1.7 km || 
|-id=341 bgcolor=#fefefe
| 114341 ||  || — || December 5, 2002 || Socorro || LINEAR || NYS || align=right | 1.4 km || 
|-id=342 bgcolor=#fefefe
| 114342 ||  || — || December 10, 2002 || Socorro || LINEAR || NYS || align=right | 1.7 km || 
|-id=343 bgcolor=#E9E9E9
| 114343 ||  || — || December 10, 2002 || Socorro || LINEAR || — || align=right | 2.1 km || 
|-id=344 bgcolor=#fefefe
| 114344 ||  || — || December 11, 2002 || Socorro || LINEAR || V || align=right | 1.4 km || 
|-id=345 bgcolor=#C2FFFF
| 114345 ||  || — || December 11, 2002 || Socorro || LINEAR || L5 || align=right | 22 km || 
|-id=346 bgcolor=#d6d6d6
| 114346 ||  || — || December 11, 2002 || Socorro || LINEAR || EOS || align=right | 6.0 km || 
|-id=347 bgcolor=#fefefe
| 114347 ||  || — || December 11, 2002 || Socorro || LINEAR || — || align=right | 1.6 km || 
|-id=348 bgcolor=#fefefe
| 114348 ||  || — || December 11, 2002 || Socorro || LINEAR || ERI || align=right | 3.9 km || 
|-id=349 bgcolor=#fefefe
| 114349 ||  || — || December 11, 2002 || Socorro || LINEAR || ERI || align=right | 1.4 km || 
|-id=350 bgcolor=#E9E9E9
| 114350 ||  || — || December 11, 2002 || Socorro || LINEAR || — || align=right | 4.5 km || 
|-id=351 bgcolor=#fefefe
| 114351 ||  || — || December 11, 2002 || Socorro || LINEAR || V || align=right | 1.7 km || 
|-id=352 bgcolor=#fefefe
| 114352 ||  || — || December 11, 2002 || Socorro || LINEAR || — || align=right | 1.4 km || 
|-id=353 bgcolor=#fefefe
| 114353 ||  || — || December 11, 2002 || Socorro || LINEAR || V || align=right | 2.1 km || 
|-id=354 bgcolor=#fefefe
| 114354 ||  || — || December 11, 2002 || Socorro || LINEAR || V || align=right | 1.4 km || 
|-id=355 bgcolor=#d6d6d6
| 114355 ||  || — || December 11, 2002 || Socorro || LINEAR || — || align=right | 6.8 km || 
|-id=356 bgcolor=#fefefe
| 114356 ||  || — || December 11, 2002 || Socorro || LINEAR || ERI || align=right | 2.7 km || 
|-id=357 bgcolor=#E9E9E9
| 114357 ||  || — || December 13, 2002 || Socorro || LINEAR || — || align=right | 2.2 km || 
|-id=358 bgcolor=#fefefe
| 114358 ||  || — || December 13, 2002 || Socorro || LINEAR || — || align=right | 3.1 km || 
|-id=359 bgcolor=#E9E9E9
| 114359 ||  || — || December 11, 2002 || Socorro || LINEAR || — || align=right | 2.9 km || 
|-id=360 bgcolor=#fefefe
| 114360 ||  || — || December 11, 2002 || Socorro || LINEAR || FLO || align=right | 1.3 km || 
|-id=361 bgcolor=#E9E9E9
| 114361 ||  || — || December 11, 2002 || Socorro || LINEAR || ADE || align=right | 5.1 km || 
|-id=362 bgcolor=#fefefe
| 114362 ||  || — || December 11, 2002 || Socorro || LINEAR || — || align=right | 1.4 km || 
|-id=363 bgcolor=#fefefe
| 114363 ||  || — || December 11, 2002 || Socorro || LINEAR || FLO || align=right | 1.4 km || 
|-id=364 bgcolor=#fefefe
| 114364 ||  || — || December 11, 2002 || Socorro || LINEAR || FLO || align=right | 1.6 km || 
|-id=365 bgcolor=#E9E9E9
| 114365 ||  || — || December 11, 2002 || Socorro || LINEAR || — || align=right | 2.7 km || 
|-id=366 bgcolor=#fefefe
| 114366 ||  || — || December 13, 2002 || Socorro || LINEAR || — || align=right | 1.9 km || 
|-id=367 bgcolor=#E9E9E9
| 114367 ||  || — || December 14, 2002 || Socorro || LINEAR || — || align=right | 6.0 km || 
|-id=368 bgcolor=#E9E9E9
| 114368 ||  || — || December 14, 2002 || Socorro || LINEAR || — || align=right | 2.3 km || 
|-id=369 bgcolor=#E9E9E9
| 114369 ||  || — || December 5, 2002 || Socorro || LINEAR || — || align=right | 2.9 km || 
|-id=370 bgcolor=#d6d6d6
| 114370 ||  || — || December 5, 2002 || Socorro || LINEAR || — || align=right | 4.8 km || 
|-id=371 bgcolor=#E9E9E9
| 114371 ||  || — || December 5, 2002 || Socorro || LINEAR || DOR || align=right | 5.9 km || 
|-id=372 bgcolor=#fefefe
| 114372 ||  || — || December 5, 2002 || Socorro || LINEAR || V || align=right | 1.5 km || 
|-id=373 bgcolor=#d6d6d6
| 114373 ||  || — || December 5, 2002 || Socorro || LINEAR || — || align=right | 7.1 km || 
|-id=374 bgcolor=#fefefe
| 114374 ||  || — || December 5, 2002 || Socorro || LINEAR || FLO || align=right | 1.2 km || 
|-id=375 bgcolor=#fefefe
| 114375 ||  || — || December 5, 2002 || Socorro || LINEAR || — || align=right | 1.6 km || 
|-id=376 bgcolor=#fefefe
| 114376 ||  || — || December 5, 2002 || Socorro || LINEAR || NYS || align=right | 3.7 km || 
|-id=377 bgcolor=#fefefe
| 114377 ||  || — || December 5, 2002 || Socorro || LINEAR || V || align=right | 1.3 km || 
|-id=378 bgcolor=#d6d6d6
| 114378 ||  || — || December 6, 2002 || Socorro || LINEAR || — || align=right | 3.6 km || 
|-id=379 bgcolor=#fefefe
| 114379 ||  || — || December 6, 2002 || Socorro || LINEAR || — || align=right | 1.4 km || 
|-id=380 bgcolor=#E9E9E9
| 114380 ||  || — || December 6, 2002 || Socorro || LINEAR || GEF || align=right | 2.6 km || 
|-id=381 bgcolor=#fefefe
| 114381 ||  || — || December 6, 2002 || Socorro || LINEAR || — || align=right | 1.9 km || 
|-id=382 bgcolor=#fefefe
| 114382 ||  || — || December 6, 2002 || Socorro || LINEAR || — || align=right | 2.1 km || 
|-id=383 bgcolor=#E9E9E9
| 114383 ||  || — || December 6, 2002 || Socorro || LINEAR || — || align=right | 2.6 km || 
|-id=384 bgcolor=#d6d6d6
| 114384 || 2002 YF || — || December 27, 2002 || Anderson Mesa || LONEOS || — || align=right | 7.7 km || 
|-id=385 bgcolor=#fefefe
| 114385 || 2002 YX || — || December 27, 2002 || Anderson Mesa || LONEOS || — || align=right | 1.4 km || 
|-id=386 bgcolor=#fefefe
| 114386 ||  || — || December 27, 2002 || Anderson Mesa || LONEOS || — || align=right | 1.6 km || 
|-id=387 bgcolor=#d6d6d6
| 114387 ||  || — || December 27, 2002 || Anderson Mesa || LONEOS || — || align=right | 6.9 km || 
|-id=388 bgcolor=#E9E9E9
| 114388 ||  || — || December 27, 2002 || Anderson Mesa || LONEOS || — || align=right | 2.4 km || 
|-id=389 bgcolor=#E9E9E9
| 114389 ||  || — || December 27, 2002 || Anderson Mesa || LONEOS || GEF || align=right | 2.4 km || 
|-id=390 bgcolor=#fefefe
| 114390 ||  || — || December 28, 2002 || Socorro || LINEAR || — || align=right | 2.4 km || 
|-id=391 bgcolor=#E9E9E9
| 114391 ||  || — || December 28, 2002 || Anderson Mesa || LONEOS || — || align=right | 1.6 km || 
|-id=392 bgcolor=#fefefe
| 114392 ||  || — || December 31, 2002 || Tebbutt || F. B. Zoltowski || V || align=right | 1.3 km || 
|-id=393 bgcolor=#fefefe
| 114393 ||  || — || December 31, 2002 || Socorro || LINEAR || V || align=right | 1.6 km || 
|-id=394 bgcolor=#E9E9E9
| 114394 ||  || — || December 31, 2002 || Socorro || LINEAR || — || align=right | 4.1 km || 
|-id=395 bgcolor=#d6d6d6
| 114395 ||  || — || December 31, 2002 || Socorro || LINEAR || — || align=right | 8.5 km || 
|-id=396 bgcolor=#E9E9E9
| 114396 ||  || — || December 31, 2002 || Socorro || LINEAR || — || align=right | 1.9 km || 
|-id=397 bgcolor=#E9E9E9
| 114397 ||  || — || December 31, 2002 || Socorro || LINEAR || MAR || align=right | 2.5 km || 
|-id=398 bgcolor=#fefefe
| 114398 ||  || — || December 31, 2002 || Socorro || LINEAR || NYS || align=right | 1.4 km || 
|-id=399 bgcolor=#fefefe
| 114399 ||  || — || December 31, 2002 || Socorro || LINEAR || NYS || align=right | 1.1 km || 
|-id=400 bgcolor=#E9E9E9
| 114400 ||  || — || December 31, 2002 || Socorro || LINEAR || — || align=right | 5.6 km || 
|}

114401–114500 

|-bgcolor=#E9E9E9
| 114401 ||  || — || December 31, 2002 || Socorro || LINEAR || — || align=right | 5.6 km || 
|-id=402 bgcolor=#E9E9E9
| 114402 ||  || — || December 31, 2002 || Socorro || LINEAR || — || align=right | 1.7 km || 
|-id=403 bgcolor=#fefefe
| 114403 ||  || — || December 31, 2002 || Socorro || LINEAR || — || align=right | 1.9 km || 
|-id=404 bgcolor=#d6d6d6
| 114404 ||  || — || December 31, 2002 || Socorro || LINEAR || EOS || align=right | 3.7 km || 
|-id=405 bgcolor=#fefefe
| 114405 ||  || — || December 31, 2002 || Socorro || LINEAR || — || align=right | 2.2 km || 
|-id=406 bgcolor=#fefefe
| 114406 ||  || — || December 31, 2002 || Socorro || LINEAR || MAS || align=right | 1.5 km || 
|-id=407 bgcolor=#fefefe
| 114407 ||  || — || December 31, 2002 || Socorro || LINEAR || V || align=right | 1.6 km || 
|-id=408 bgcolor=#d6d6d6
| 114408 ||  || — || December 31, 2002 || Socorro || LINEAR || EOS || align=right | 4.9 km || 
|-id=409 bgcolor=#fefefe
| 114409 ||  || — || December 31, 2002 || Socorro || LINEAR || MAS || align=right | 1.2 km || 
|-id=410 bgcolor=#fefefe
| 114410 ||  || — || December 31, 2002 || Socorro || LINEAR || — || align=right | 1.2 km || 
|-id=411 bgcolor=#fefefe
| 114411 ||  || — || December 31, 2002 || Socorro || LINEAR || NYS || align=right | 1.4 km || 
|-id=412 bgcolor=#fefefe
| 114412 ||  || — || December 31, 2002 || Socorro || LINEAR || — || align=right | 2.1 km || 
|-id=413 bgcolor=#d6d6d6
| 114413 ||  || — || December 31, 2002 || Socorro || LINEAR || EOS || align=right | 3.6 km || 
|-id=414 bgcolor=#fefefe
| 114414 ||  || — || December 31, 2002 || Socorro || LINEAR || — || align=right | 2.2 km || 
|-id=415 bgcolor=#fefefe
| 114415 ||  || — || December 31, 2002 || Socorro || LINEAR || NYS || align=right | 1.2 km || 
|-id=416 bgcolor=#fefefe
| 114416 ||  || — || December 31, 2002 || Socorro || LINEAR || — || align=right | 2.0 km || 
|-id=417 bgcolor=#d6d6d6
| 114417 ||  || — || December 31, 2002 || Socorro || LINEAR || — || align=right | 5.8 km || 
|-id=418 bgcolor=#fefefe
| 114418 ||  || — || December 31, 2002 || Socorro || LINEAR || — || align=right | 3.1 km || 
|-id=419 bgcolor=#fefefe
| 114419 ||  || — || December 31, 2002 || Socorro || LINEAR || — || align=right | 1.6 km || 
|-id=420 bgcolor=#E9E9E9
| 114420 ||  || — || December 31, 2002 || Socorro || LINEAR || — || align=right | 4.3 km || 
|-id=421 bgcolor=#E9E9E9
| 114421 ||  || — || December 31, 2002 || Socorro || LINEAR || — || align=right | 1.8 km || 
|-id=422 bgcolor=#fefefe
| 114422 ||  || — || December 31, 2002 || Socorro || LINEAR || V || align=right | 1.2 km || 
|-id=423 bgcolor=#E9E9E9
| 114423 ||  || — || December 31, 2002 || Socorro || LINEAR || — || align=right | 3.1 km || 
|-id=424 bgcolor=#E9E9E9
| 114424 ||  || — || December 31, 2002 || Socorro || LINEAR || — || align=right | 3.5 km || 
|-id=425 bgcolor=#fefefe
| 114425 || 2003 AV || — || January 1, 2003 || Socorro || LINEAR || — || align=right | 4.3 km || 
|-id=426 bgcolor=#E9E9E9
| 114426 ||  || — || January 2, 2003 || Socorro || LINEAR || — || align=right | 3.0 km || 
|-id=427 bgcolor=#E9E9E9
| 114427 ||  || — || January 1, 2003 || Socorro || LINEAR || — || align=right | 5.9 km || 
|-id=428 bgcolor=#fefefe
| 114428 ||  || — || January 3, 2003 || Socorro || LINEAR || — || align=right | 2.0 km || 
|-id=429 bgcolor=#fefefe
| 114429 ||  || — || January 1, 2003 || Socorro || LINEAR || — || align=right | 2.0 km || 
|-id=430 bgcolor=#E9E9E9
| 114430 ||  || — || January 1, 2003 || Socorro || LINEAR || — || align=right | 2.1 km || 
|-id=431 bgcolor=#E9E9E9
| 114431 ||  || — || January 1, 2003 || Socorro || LINEAR || — || align=right | 2.6 km || 
|-id=432 bgcolor=#fefefe
| 114432 ||  || — || January 1, 2003 || Socorro || LINEAR || FLO || align=right | 1.4 km || 
|-id=433 bgcolor=#d6d6d6
| 114433 ||  || — || January 2, 2003 || Socorro || LINEAR || 7:4 || align=right | 7.6 km || 
|-id=434 bgcolor=#E9E9E9
| 114434 ||  || — || January 1, 2003 || Socorro || LINEAR || ADE || align=right | 2.8 km || 
|-id=435 bgcolor=#E9E9E9
| 114435 ||  || — || January 1, 2003 || Socorro || LINEAR || EUN || align=right | 3.3 km || 
|-id=436 bgcolor=#fefefe
| 114436 ||  || — || January 1, 2003 || Socorro || LINEAR || — || align=right | 1.3 km || 
|-id=437 bgcolor=#E9E9E9
| 114437 ||  || — || January 1, 2003 || Socorro || LINEAR || — || align=right | 5.8 km || 
|-id=438 bgcolor=#E9E9E9
| 114438 ||  || — || January 1, 2003 || Socorro || LINEAR || — || align=right | 4.3 km || 
|-id=439 bgcolor=#fefefe
| 114439 ||  || — || January 1, 2003 || Socorro || LINEAR || slow || align=right | 2.1 km || 
|-id=440 bgcolor=#E9E9E9
| 114440 ||  || — || January 1, 2003 || Socorro || LINEAR || — || align=right | 2.9 km || 
|-id=441 bgcolor=#d6d6d6
| 114441 ||  || — || January 2, 2003 || Socorro || LINEAR || — || align=right | 5.0 km || 
|-id=442 bgcolor=#E9E9E9
| 114442 ||  || — || January 2, 2003 || Socorro || LINEAR || EUN || align=right | 2.2 km || 
|-id=443 bgcolor=#fefefe
| 114443 ||  || — || January 4, 2003 || Socorro || LINEAR || NYS || align=right | 1.6 km || 
|-id=444 bgcolor=#E9E9E9
| 114444 ||  || — || January 5, 2003 || Socorro || LINEAR || — || align=right | 2.7 km || 
|-id=445 bgcolor=#fefefe
| 114445 ||  || — || January 3, 2003 || Socorro || LINEAR || — || align=right | 1.4 km || 
|-id=446 bgcolor=#d6d6d6
| 114446 ||  || — || January 3, 2003 || Kitt Peak || Spacewatch || — || align=right | 7.2 km || 
|-id=447 bgcolor=#E9E9E9
| 114447 ||  || — || January 5, 2003 || Socorro || LINEAR || — || align=right | 2.6 km || 
|-id=448 bgcolor=#fefefe
| 114448 ||  || — || January 5, 2003 || Socorro || LINEAR || MAS || align=right | 1.6 km || 
|-id=449 bgcolor=#E9E9E9
| 114449 ||  || — || January 5, 2003 || Socorro || LINEAR || — || align=right | 2.4 km || 
|-id=450 bgcolor=#E9E9E9
| 114450 ||  || — || January 5, 2003 || Socorro || LINEAR || — || align=right | 3.1 km || 
|-id=451 bgcolor=#fefefe
| 114451 ||  || — || January 4, 2003 || Socorro || LINEAR || — || align=right | 1.8 km || 
|-id=452 bgcolor=#fefefe
| 114452 ||  || — || January 4, 2003 || Socorro || LINEAR || — || align=right | 2.6 km || 
|-id=453 bgcolor=#d6d6d6
| 114453 ||  || — || January 4, 2003 || Socorro || LINEAR || — || align=right | 7.0 km || 
|-id=454 bgcolor=#E9E9E9
| 114454 ||  || — || January 4, 2003 || Socorro || LINEAR || — || align=right | 4.7 km || 
|-id=455 bgcolor=#E9E9E9
| 114455 ||  || — || January 4, 2003 || Socorro || LINEAR || MAR || align=right | 2.6 km || 
|-id=456 bgcolor=#fefefe
| 114456 ||  || — || January 4, 2003 || Socorro || LINEAR || MAS || align=right | 1.4 km || 
|-id=457 bgcolor=#fefefe
| 114457 ||  || — || January 4, 2003 || Socorro || LINEAR || V || align=right | 1.3 km || 
|-id=458 bgcolor=#fefefe
| 114458 ||  || — || January 4, 2003 || Socorro || LINEAR || — || align=right | 2.1 km || 
|-id=459 bgcolor=#fefefe
| 114459 ||  || — || January 4, 2003 || Socorro || LINEAR || V || align=right | 1.7 km || 
|-id=460 bgcolor=#E9E9E9
| 114460 ||  || — || January 5, 2003 || Socorro || LINEAR || — || align=right | 5.3 km || 
|-id=461 bgcolor=#fefefe
| 114461 ||  || — || January 7, 2003 || Socorro || LINEAR || V || align=right | 1.4 km || 
|-id=462 bgcolor=#fefefe
| 114462 ||  || — || January 7, 2003 || Socorro || LINEAR || — || align=right | 1.3 km || 
|-id=463 bgcolor=#fefefe
| 114463 ||  || — || January 7, 2003 || Socorro || LINEAR || — || align=right | 2.4 km || 
|-id=464 bgcolor=#E9E9E9
| 114464 ||  || — || January 7, 2003 || Socorro || LINEAR || — || align=right | 3.6 km || 
|-id=465 bgcolor=#d6d6d6
| 114465 ||  || — || January 7, 2003 || Socorro || LINEAR || — || align=right | 6.3 km || 
|-id=466 bgcolor=#d6d6d6
| 114466 ||  || — || January 7, 2003 || Socorro || LINEAR || — || align=right | 9.2 km || 
|-id=467 bgcolor=#E9E9E9
| 114467 ||  || — || January 7, 2003 || Socorro || LINEAR || — || align=right | 2.3 km || 
|-id=468 bgcolor=#E9E9E9
| 114468 ||  || — || January 7, 2003 || Socorro || LINEAR || EUN || align=right | 2.5 km || 
|-id=469 bgcolor=#fefefe
| 114469 ||  || — || January 7, 2003 || Socorro || LINEAR || — || align=right | 2.6 km || 
|-id=470 bgcolor=#d6d6d6
| 114470 ||  || — || January 7, 2003 || Socorro || LINEAR || — || align=right | 6.8 km || 
|-id=471 bgcolor=#fefefe
| 114471 ||  || — || January 7, 2003 || Socorro || LINEAR || — || align=right | 1.7 km || 
|-id=472 bgcolor=#fefefe
| 114472 ||  || — || January 7, 2003 || Socorro || LINEAR || V || align=right | 1.2 km || 
|-id=473 bgcolor=#E9E9E9
| 114473 ||  || — || January 7, 2003 || Socorro || LINEAR || — || align=right | 2.5 km || 
|-id=474 bgcolor=#fefefe
| 114474 ||  || — || January 7, 2003 || Socorro || LINEAR || — || align=right | 1.7 km || 
|-id=475 bgcolor=#E9E9E9
| 114475 ||  || — || January 7, 2003 || Socorro || LINEAR || — || align=right | 2.4 km || 
|-id=476 bgcolor=#fefefe
| 114476 ||  || — || January 7, 2003 || Socorro || LINEAR || — || align=right | 1.9 km || 
|-id=477 bgcolor=#fefefe
| 114477 ||  || — || January 5, 2003 || Socorro || LINEAR || — || align=right | 1.5 km || 
|-id=478 bgcolor=#fefefe
| 114478 ||  || — || January 5, 2003 || Socorro || LINEAR || FLO || align=right | 1.5 km || 
|-id=479 bgcolor=#fefefe
| 114479 ||  || — || January 5, 2003 || Socorro || LINEAR || NYS || align=right | 3.0 km || 
|-id=480 bgcolor=#E9E9E9
| 114480 ||  || — || January 5, 2003 || Socorro || LINEAR || — || align=right | 2.5 km || 
|-id=481 bgcolor=#fefefe
| 114481 ||  || — || January 5, 2003 || Socorro || LINEAR || FLO || align=right | 1.6 km || 
|-id=482 bgcolor=#E9E9E9
| 114482 ||  || — || January 5, 2003 || Socorro || LINEAR || — || align=right | 2.4 km || 
|-id=483 bgcolor=#fefefe
| 114483 ||  || — || January 5, 2003 || Socorro || LINEAR || NYS || align=right | 1.4 km || 
|-id=484 bgcolor=#E9E9E9
| 114484 ||  || — || January 5, 2003 || Socorro || LINEAR || — || align=right | 4.0 km || 
|-id=485 bgcolor=#fefefe
| 114485 ||  || — || January 5, 2003 || Socorro || LINEAR || FLO || align=right | 1.1 km || 
|-id=486 bgcolor=#d6d6d6
| 114486 ||  || — || January 5, 2003 || Socorro || LINEAR || — || align=right | 3.9 km || 
|-id=487 bgcolor=#fefefe
| 114487 ||  || — || January 5, 2003 || Socorro || LINEAR || — || align=right | 1.7 km || 
|-id=488 bgcolor=#fefefe
| 114488 ||  || — || January 5, 2003 || Socorro || LINEAR || — || align=right | 2.0 km || 
|-id=489 bgcolor=#fefefe
| 114489 ||  || — || January 5, 2003 || Socorro || LINEAR || NYS || align=right | 1.5 km || 
|-id=490 bgcolor=#fefefe
| 114490 ||  || — || January 5, 2003 || Socorro || LINEAR || — || align=right | 2.0 km || 
|-id=491 bgcolor=#fefefe
| 114491 ||  || — || January 5, 2003 || Socorro || LINEAR || — || align=right | 2.0 km || 
|-id=492 bgcolor=#fefefe
| 114492 ||  || — || January 5, 2003 || Socorro || LINEAR || FLO || align=right | 1.9 km || 
|-id=493 bgcolor=#fefefe
| 114493 ||  || — || January 7, 2003 || Socorro || LINEAR || — || align=right | 1.3 km || 
|-id=494 bgcolor=#fefefe
| 114494 ||  || — || January 7, 2003 || Socorro || LINEAR || ERI || align=right | 3.6 km || 
|-id=495 bgcolor=#d6d6d6
| 114495 ||  || — || January 7, 2003 || Socorro || LINEAR || — || align=right | 4.3 km || 
|-id=496 bgcolor=#d6d6d6
| 114496 ||  || — || January 7, 2003 || Socorro || LINEAR || — || align=right | 7.6 km || 
|-id=497 bgcolor=#fefefe
| 114497 ||  || — || January 8, 2003 || Socorro || LINEAR || NYS || align=right | 2.9 km || 
|-id=498 bgcolor=#fefefe
| 114498 ||  || — || January 8, 2003 || Socorro || LINEAR || — || align=right | 1.7 km || 
|-id=499 bgcolor=#fefefe
| 114499 ||  || — || January 10, 2003 || Socorro || LINEAR || — || align=right | 1.9 km || 
|-id=500 bgcolor=#E9E9E9
| 114500 ||  || — || January 10, 2003 || Socorro || LINEAR || — || align=right | 3.8 km || 
|}

114501–114600 

|-bgcolor=#E9E9E9
| 114501 ||  || — || January 11, 2003 || Socorro || LINEAR || — || align=right | 3.1 km || 
|-id=502 bgcolor=#fefefe
| 114502 ||  || — || January 10, 2003 || Socorro || LINEAR || FLO || align=right | 1.4 km || 
|-id=503 bgcolor=#E9E9E9
| 114503 ||  || — || January 10, 2003 || Socorro || LINEAR || — || align=right | 3.2 km || 
|-id=504 bgcolor=#E9E9E9
| 114504 ||  || — || January 10, 2003 || Socorro || LINEAR || — || align=right | 2.6 km || 
|-id=505 bgcolor=#E9E9E9
| 114505 ||  || — || January 10, 2003 || Kitt Peak || Spacewatch || HOF || align=right | 5.0 km || 
|-id=506 bgcolor=#fefefe
| 114506 ||  || — || January 11, 2003 || Socorro || LINEAR || — || align=right | 2.6 km || 
|-id=507 bgcolor=#FA8072
| 114507 ||  || — || January 12, 2003 || Socorro || LINEAR || PHO || align=right | 1.7 km || 
|-id=508 bgcolor=#fefefe
| 114508 ||  || — || January 11, 2003 || Kitt Peak || Spacewatch || — || align=right | 4.3 km || 
|-id=509 bgcolor=#d6d6d6
| 114509 ||  || — || January 7, 2003 || Socorro || LINEAR || — || align=right | 4.4 km || 
|-id=510 bgcolor=#fefefe
| 114510 ||  || — || January 1, 2003 || Socorro || LINEAR || — || align=right | 1.8 km || 
|-id=511 bgcolor=#E9E9E9
| 114511 ||  || — || January 2, 2003 || Socorro || LINEAR || — || align=right | 3.9 km || 
|-id=512 bgcolor=#fefefe
| 114512 ||  || — || January 4, 2003 || Socorro || LINEAR || ERI || align=right | 3.4 km || 
|-id=513 bgcolor=#d6d6d6
| 114513 ||  || — || January 26, 2003 || Palomar || NEAT || HIL3:2 || align=right | 8.9 km || 
|-id=514 bgcolor=#E9E9E9
| 114514 ||  || — || January 26, 2003 || Haleakala || NEAT || — || align=right | 4.5 km || 
|-id=515 bgcolor=#d6d6d6
| 114515 ||  || — || January 25, 2003 || Anderson Mesa || LONEOS || — || align=right | 5.5 km || 
|-id=516 bgcolor=#E9E9E9
| 114516 ||  || — || January 26, 2003 || Palomar || NEAT || EUN || align=right | 2.8 km || 
|-id=517 bgcolor=#fefefe
| 114517 ||  || — || January 26, 2003 || Palomar || NEAT || NYS || align=right | 1.2 km || 
|-id=518 bgcolor=#d6d6d6
| 114518 ||  || — || January 26, 2003 || Anderson Mesa || LONEOS || — || align=right | 6.0 km || 
|-id=519 bgcolor=#d6d6d6
| 114519 ||  || — || January 26, 2003 || Anderson Mesa || LONEOS || — || align=right | 5.1 km || 
|-id=520 bgcolor=#d6d6d6
| 114520 ||  || — || January 26, 2003 || Anderson Mesa || LONEOS || — || align=right | 5.9 km || 
|-id=521 bgcolor=#d6d6d6
| 114521 ||  || — || January 26, 2003 || Anderson Mesa || LONEOS || — || align=right | 7.2 km || 
|-id=522 bgcolor=#E9E9E9
| 114522 ||  || — || January 26, 2003 || Anderson Mesa || LONEOS || — || align=right | 3.9 km || 
|-id=523 bgcolor=#fefefe
| 114523 ||  || — || January 26, 2003 || Anderson Mesa || LONEOS || NYS || align=right | 1.4 km || 
|-id=524 bgcolor=#E9E9E9
| 114524 ||  || — || January 26, 2003 || Palomar || NEAT || — || align=right | 2.0 km || 
|-id=525 bgcolor=#fefefe
| 114525 ||  || — || January 26, 2003 || Haleakala || NEAT || — || align=right | 1.5 km || 
|-id=526 bgcolor=#E9E9E9
| 114526 ||  || — || January 26, 2003 || Anderson Mesa || LONEOS || — || align=right | 4.8 km || 
|-id=527 bgcolor=#fefefe
| 114527 ||  || — || January 26, 2003 || Haleakala || NEAT || NYS || align=right | 1.6 km || 
|-id=528 bgcolor=#d6d6d6
| 114528 ||  || — || January 26, 2003 || Haleakala || NEAT || — || align=right | 6.2 km || 
|-id=529 bgcolor=#E9E9E9
| 114529 ||  || — || January 26, 2003 || Haleakala || NEAT || — || align=right | 2.9 km || 
|-id=530 bgcolor=#E9E9E9
| 114530 ||  || — || January 26, 2003 || Haleakala || NEAT || — || align=right | 4.7 km || 
|-id=531 bgcolor=#fefefe
| 114531 ||  || — || January 27, 2003 || Socorro || LINEAR || MAS || align=right | 1.2 km || 
|-id=532 bgcolor=#fefefe
| 114532 ||  || — || January 27, 2003 || Socorro || LINEAR || NYS || align=right | 1.3 km || 
|-id=533 bgcolor=#d6d6d6
| 114533 ||  || — || January 27, 2003 || Socorro || LINEAR || EUP || align=right | 13 km || 
|-id=534 bgcolor=#FA8072
| 114534 ||  || — || January 26, 2003 || Anderson Mesa || LONEOS || — || align=right | 9.9 km || 
|-id=535 bgcolor=#E9E9E9
| 114535 ||  || — || January 26, 2003 || Anderson Mesa || LONEOS || — || align=right | 3.6 km || 
|-id=536 bgcolor=#E9E9E9
| 114536 ||  || — || January 27, 2003 || Socorro || LINEAR || INO || align=right | 3.7 km || 
|-id=537 bgcolor=#d6d6d6
| 114537 ||  || — || January 27, 2003 || Anderson Mesa || LONEOS || EOS || align=right | 4.3 km || 
|-id=538 bgcolor=#fefefe
| 114538 ||  || — || January 27, 2003 || Socorro || LINEAR || — || align=right | 2.0 km || 
|-id=539 bgcolor=#fefefe
| 114539 ||  || — || January 24, 2003 || Palomar || NEAT || — || align=right | 3.7 km || 
|-id=540 bgcolor=#E9E9E9
| 114540 ||  || — || January 25, 2003 || Palomar || NEAT || — || align=right | 4.6 km || 
|-id=541 bgcolor=#E9E9E9
| 114541 ||  || — || January 26, 2003 || Palomar || NEAT || slow || align=right | 2.9 km || 
|-id=542 bgcolor=#E9E9E9
| 114542 ||  || — || January 26, 2003 || Palomar || NEAT || — || align=right | 2.7 km || 
|-id=543 bgcolor=#fefefe
| 114543 ||  || — || January 26, 2003 || Anderson Mesa || LONEOS || NYS || align=right | 1.6 km || 
|-id=544 bgcolor=#E9E9E9
| 114544 ||  || — || January 26, 2003 || Haleakala || NEAT || — || align=right | 3.7 km || 
|-id=545 bgcolor=#d6d6d6
| 114545 ||  || — || January 27, 2003 || Socorro || LINEAR || — || align=right | 3.5 km || 
|-id=546 bgcolor=#fefefe
| 114546 ||  || — || January 27, 2003 || Socorro || LINEAR || NYS || align=right | 1.4 km || 
|-id=547 bgcolor=#d6d6d6
| 114547 ||  || — || January 27, 2003 || Socorro || LINEAR || EOS || align=right | 4.7 km || 
|-id=548 bgcolor=#E9E9E9
| 114548 ||  || — || January 27, 2003 || Socorro || LINEAR || EUN || align=right | 3.1 km || 
|-id=549 bgcolor=#d6d6d6
| 114549 ||  || — || January 27, 2003 || Palomar || NEAT || — || align=right | 4.3 km || 
|-id=550 bgcolor=#fefefe
| 114550 ||  || — || January 27, 2003 || Haleakala || NEAT || NYS || align=right | 1.2 km || 
|-id=551 bgcolor=#E9E9E9
| 114551 ||  || — || January 26, 2003 || Haleakala || NEAT || HOF || align=right | 4.6 km || 
|-id=552 bgcolor=#d6d6d6
| 114552 ||  || — || January 27, 2003 || Anderson Mesa || LONEOS || ULA7:4 || align=right | 9.6 km || 
|-id=553 bgcolor=#FA8072
| 114553 ||  || — || January 27, 2003 || Haleakala || NEAT || — || align=right | 2.8 km || 
|-id=554 bgcolor=#E9E9E9
| 114554 ||  || — || January 28, 2003 || Socorro || LINEAR || CLO || align=right | 3.6 km || 
|-id=555 bgcolor=#E9E9E9
| 114555 ||  || — || January 27, 2003 || Socorro || LINEAR || DOR || align=right | 6.0 km || 
|-id=556 bgcolor=#E9E9E9
| 114556 ||  || — || January 27, 2003 || Socorro || LINEAR || slow || align=right | 2.2 km || 
|-id=557 bgcolor=#E9E9E9
| 114557 ||  || — || January 27, 2003 || Socorro || LINEAR || — || align=right | 3.4 km || 
|-id=558 bgcolor=#E9E9E9
| 114558 ||  || — || January 27, 2003 || Socorro || LINEAR || — || align=right | 4.0 km || 
|-id=559 bgcolor=#E9E9E9
| 114559 ||  || — || January 27, 2003 || Socorro || LINEAR || EUN || align=right | 3.4 km || 
|-id=560 bgcolor=#d6d6d6
| 114560 ||  || — || January 27, 2003 || Socorro || LINEAR || HYG || align=right | 6.8 km || 
|-id=561 bgcolor=#fefefe
| 114561 ||  || — || January 27, 2003 || Socorro || LINEAR || EUT || align=right | 1.5 km || 
|-id=562 bgcolor=#d6d6d6
| 114562 ||  || — || January 27, 2003 || Anderson Mesa || LONEOS || EOS || align=right | 3.7 km || 
|-id=563 bgcolor=#fefefe
| 114563 ||  || — || January 27, 2003 || Palomar || NEAT || MAS || align=right | 1.5 km || 
|-id=564 bgcolor=#E9E9E9
| 114564 ||  || — || January 28, 2003 || Socorro || LINEAR || — || align=right | 3.1 km || 
|-id=565 bgcolor=#fefefe
| 114565 ||  || — || January 27, 2003 || Palomar || NEAT || — || align=right | 1.5 km || 
|-id=566 bgcolor=#fefefe
| 114566 ||  || — || January 28, 2003 || Palomar || NEAT || V || align=right | 1.3 km || 
|-id=567 bgcolor=#d6d6d6
| 114567 ||  || — || January 28, 2003 || Socorro || LINEAR || FIR || align=right | 7.1 km || 
|-id=568 bgcolor=#d6d6d6
| 114568 ||  || — || January 28, 2003 || Socorro || LINEAR || — || align=right | 3.5 km || 
|-id=569 bgcolor=#E9E9E9
| 114569 ||  || — || January 28, 2003 || Socorro || LINEAR || — || align=right | 7.2 km || 
|-id=570 bgcolor=#E9E9E9
| 114570 ||  || — || January 28, 2003 || Haleakala || NEAT || — || align=right | 3.9 km || 
|-id=571 bgcolor=#E9E9E9
| 114571 ||  || — || January 30, 2003 || Anderson Mesa || LONEOS || AER || align=right | 2.7 km || 
|-id=572 bgcolor=#d6d6d6
| 114572 ||  || — || January 27, 2003 || Palomar || NEAT || — || align=right | 5.6 km || 
|-id=573 bgcolor=#d6d6d6
| 114573 ||  || — || January 28, 2003 || Palomar || NEAT || HYG || align=right | 5.2 km || 
|-id=574 bgcolor=#d6d6d6
| 114574 ||  || — || January 28, 2003 || Socorro || LINEAR || — || align=right | 7.2 km || 
|-id=575 bgcolor=#FA8072
| 114575 ||  || — || January 31, 2003 || Socorro || LINEAR || — || align=right | 2.7 km || 
|-id=576 bgcolor=#d6d6d6
| 114576 ||  || — || January 28, 2003 || Haleakala || NEAT || HYG || align=right | 6.6 km || 
|-id=577 bgcolor=#fefefe
| 114577 ||  || — || January 29, 2003 || Palomar || NEAT || ERI || align=right | 3.3 km || 
|-id=578 bgcolor=#E9E9E9
| 114578 ||  || — || January 29, 2003 || Palomar || NEAT || — || align=right | 4.5 km || 
|-id=579 bgcolor=#d6d6d6
| 114579 ||  || — || January 29, 2003 || Palomar || NEAT || EOS || align=right | 3.5 km || 
|-id=580 bgcolor=#d6d6d6
| 114580 ||  || — || January 30, 2003 || Anderson Mesa || LONEOS || EOS || align=right | 4.0 km || 
|-id=581 bgcolor=#d6d6d6
| 114581 ||  || — || January 30, 2003 || Anderson Mesa || LONEOS || — || align=right | 4.9 km || 
|-id=582 bgcolor=#fefefe
| 114582 ||  || — || January 31, 2003 || Socorro || LINEAR || — || align=right | 1.9 km || 
|-id=583 bgcolor=#fefefe
| 114583 ||  || — || January 31, 2003 || Socorro || LINEAR || — || align=right | 2.2 km || 
|-id=584 bgcolor=#E9E9E9
| 114584 ||  || — || January 31, 2003 || Anderson Mesa || LONEOS || — || align=right | 4.2 km || 
|-id=585 bgcolor=#E9E9E9
| 114585 ||  || — || January 31, 2003 || Anderson Mesa || LONEOS || HNS || align=right | 2.7 km || 
|-id=586 bgcolor=#d6d6d6
| 114586 ||  || — || January 30, 2003 || Anderson Mesa || LONEOS || — || align=right | 6.1 km || 
|-id=587 bgcolor=#E9E9E9
| 114587 ||  || — || January 31, 2003 || Socorro || LINEAR || — || align=right | 3.1 km || 
|-id=588 bgcolor=#fefefe
| 114588 ||  || — || January 31, 2003 || Socorro || LINEAR || NYS || align=right | 1.6 km || 
|-id=589 bgcolor=#d6d6d6
| 114589 ||  || — || January 31, 2003 || Socorro || LINEAR || — || align=right | 5.5 km || 
|-id=590 bgcolor=#E9E9E9
| 114590 ||  || — || January 23, 2003 || Kitt Peak || Spacewatch || — || align=right | 5.3 km || 
|-id=591 bgcolor=#fefefe
| 114591 ||  || — || February 1, 2003 || Socorro || LINEAR || NYS || align=right | 1.1 km || 
|-id=592 bgcolor=#E9E9E9
| 114592 ||  || — || February 2, 2003 || Socorro || LINEAR || — || align=right | 4.2 km || 
|-id=593 bgcolor=#fefefe
| 114593 ||  || — || February 2, 2003 || Socorro || LINEAR || — || align=right | 1.7 km || 
|-id=594 bgcolor=#E9E9E9
| 114594 ||  || — || February 1, 2003 || Socorro || LINEAR || — || align=right | 5.9 km || 
|-id=595 bgcolor=#d6d6d6
| 114595 ||  || — || February 1, 2003 || Socorro || LINEAR || — || align=right | 5.1 km || 
|-id=596 bgcolor=#fefefe
| 114596 ||  || — || February 1, 2003 || Socorro || LINEAR || — || align=right | 1.5 km || 
|-id=597 bgcolor=#E9E9E9
| 114597 ||  || — || February 1, 2003 || Socorro || LINEAR || EUN || align=right | 2.4 km || 
|-id=598 bgcolor=#E9E9E9
| 114598 ||  || — || February 1, 2003 || Haleakala || NEAT || — || align=right | 4.5 km || 
|-id=599 bgcolor=#d6d6d6
| 114599 ||  || — || February 2, 2003 || Anderson Mesa || LONEOS || — || align=right | 12 km || 
|-id=600 bgcolor=#E9E9E9
| 114600 ||  || — || February 2, 2003 || Socorro || LINEAR || MAR || align=right | 3.7 km || 
|}

114601–114700 

|-bgcolor=#E9E9E9
| 114601 ||  || — || February 2, 2003 || Palomar || NEAT || — || align=right | 4.4 km || 
|-id=602 bgcolor=#d6d6d6
| 114602 ||  || — || February 2, 2003 || Palomar || NEAT || TEL || align=right | 2.9 km || 
|-id=603 bgcolor=#fefefe
| 114603 ||  || — || February 2, 2003 || Palomar || NEAT || — || align=right | 1.6 km || 
|-id=604 bgcolor=#d6d6d6
| 114604 ||  || — || February 3, 2003 || Palomar || NEAT || — || align=right | 4.5 km || 
|-id=605 bgcolor=#E9E9E9
| 114605 ||  || — || February 4, 2003 || Haleakala-AMOS(!) || NEAT || — || align=right | 1.3 km || 
|-id=606 bgcolor=#E9E9E9
| 114606 ||  || — || February 6, 2003 || Socorro || LINEAR || AER || align=right | 3.0 km || 
|-id=607 bgcolor=#E9E9E9
| 114607 ||  || — || February 19, 2003 || Palomar || NEAT || — || align=right | 4.3 km || 
|-id=608 bgcolor=#d6d6d6
| 114608 Emanuelepace ||  ||  || February 23, 2003 || Campo Imperatore || CINEOS || TIR || align=right | 5.8 km || 
|-id=609 bgcolor=#E9E9E9
| 114609 ||  || — || February 22, 2003 || Palomar || NEAT || AEO || align=right | 2.6 km || 
|-id=610 bgcolor=#fefefe
| 114610 ||  || — || February 22, 2003 || Palomar || NEAT || — || align=right | 1.2 km || 
|-id=611 bgcolor=#d6d6d6
| 114611 Valeriobocci ||  ||   || February 24, 2003 || Campo Imperatore || CINEOS || — || align=right | 5.1 km || 
|-id=612 bgcolor=#d6d6d6
| 114612 Sandrasavaglio ||  ||  || February 26, 2003 || Campo Imperatore || CINEOS || — || align=right | 4.4 km || 
|-id=613 bgcolor=#d6d6d6
| 114613 Antoninobrosio ||  ||  || February 25, 2003 || Campo Imperatore || CINEOS || — || align=right | 5.7 km || 
|-id=614 bgcolor=#d6d6d6
| 114614 ||  || — || February 22, 2003 || Goodricke-Pigott || J. W. Kessel || EMA || align=right | 8.0 km || 
|-id=615 bgcolor=#d6d6d6
| 114615 ||  || — || February 19, 2003 || Palomar || NEAT || — || align=right | 3.7 km || 
|-id=616 bgcolor=#E9E9E9
| 114616 ||  || — || February 21, 2003 || Palomar || NEAT || — || align=right | 3.9 km || 
|-id=617 bgcolor=#E9E9E9
| 114617 ||  || — || February 22, 2003 || Palomar || NEAT || — || align=right | 2.7 km || 
|-id=618 bgcolor=#d6d6d6
| 114618 || 2003 EO || — || March 3, 2003 || Palomar || NEAT || — || align=right | 3.5 km || 
|-id=619 bgcolor=#E9E9E9
| 114619 || 2003 EP || — || March 3, 2003 || Haleakala || NEAT || — || align=right | 3.6 km || 
|-id=620 bgcolor=#d6d6d6
| 114620 ||  || — || March 6, 2003 || Desert Eagle || W. K. Y. Yeung || — || align=right | 7.4 km || 
|-id=621 bgcolor=#d6d6d6
| 114621 ||  || — || March 5, 2003 || Socorro || LINEAR || — || align=right | 3.8 km || 
|-id=622 bgcolor=#E9E9E9
| 114622 ||  || — || March 6, 2003 || Anderson Mesa || LONEOS || — || align=right | 2.8 km || 
|-id=623 bgcolor=#d6d6d6
| 114623 ||  || — || March 6, 2003 || Anderson Mesa || LONEOS || — || align=right | 4.4 km || 
|-id=624 bgcolor=#d6d6d6
| 114624 ||  || — || March 6, 2003 || Anderson Mesa || LONEOS || HYG || align=right | 4.1 km || 
|-id=625 bgcolor=#E9E9E9
| 114625 ||  || — || March 6, 2003 || Socorro || LINEAR || — || align=right | 4.3 km || 
|-id=626 bgcolor=#d6d6d6
| 114626 ||  || — || March 6, 2003 || Socorro || LINEAR || LIX || align=right | 7.2 km || 
|-id=627 bgcolor=#d6d6d6
| 114627 ||  || — || March 7, 2003 || Palomar || NEAT || — || align=right | 4.4 km || 
|-id=628 bgcolor=#fefefe
| 114628 ||  || — || March 8, 2003 || Nogales || P. R. Holvorcem, M. Schwartz || — || align=right | 1.8 km || 
|-id=629 bgcolor=#d6d6d6
| 114629 ||  || — || March 6, 2003 || Anderson Mesa || LONEOS || — || align=right | 3.6 km || 
|-id=630 bgcolor=#E9E9E9
| 114630 ||  || — || March 6, 2003 || Anderson Mesa || LONEOS || — || align=right | 4.3 km || 
|-id=631 bgcolor=#E9E9E9
| 114631 ||  || — || March 6, 2003 || Goodricke-Pigott || Goodricke-Pigott Obs. || AGN || align=right | 2.4 km || 
|-id=632 bgcolor=#d6d6d6
| 114632 ||  || — || March 6, 2003 || Anderson Mesa || LONEOS || — || align=right | 5.9 km || 
|-id=633 bgcolor=#d6d6d6
| 114633 ||  || — || March 6, 2003 || Socorro || LINEAR || — || align=right | 5.9 km || 
|-id=634 bgcolor=#E9E9E9
| 114634 ||  || — || March 6, 2003 || Socorro || LINEAR || — || align=right | 1.8 km || 
|-id=635 bgcolor=#d6d6d6
| 114635 ||  || — || March 6, 2003 || Socorro || LINEAR || THM || align=right | 6.4 km || 
|-id=636 bgcolor=#E9E9E9
| 114636 ||  || — || March 6, 2003 || Socorro || LINEAR || GEF || align=right | 2.8 km || 
|-id=637 bgcolor=#fefefe
| 114637 ||  || — || March 6, 2003 || Socorro || LINEAR || — || align=right | 2.2 km || 
|-id=638 bgcolor=#E9E9E9
| 114638 ||  || — || March 6, 2003 || Socorro || LINEAR || — || align=right | 3.7 km || 
|-id=639 bgcolor=#d6d6d6
| 114639 ||  || — || March 7, 2003 || Kitt Peak || Spacewatch || THM || align=right | 4.9 km || 
|-id=640 bgcolor=#d6d6d6
| 114640 ||  || — || March 7, 2003 || Socorro || LINEAR || MEL || align=right | 7.0 km || 
|-id=641 bgcolor=#d6d6d6
| 114641 ||  || — || March 8, 2003 || Kitt Peak || Spacewatch || KOR || align=right | 2.3 km || 
|-id=642 bgcolor=#E9E9E9
| 114642 ||  || — || March 8, 2003 || Socorro || LINEAR || MAR || align=right | 2.1 km || 
|-id=643 bgcolor=#d6d6d6
| 114643 ||  || — || March 8, 2003 || Socorro || LINEAR || — || align=right | 7.8 km || 
|-id=644 bgcolor=#fefefe
| 114644 ||  || — || March 8, 2003 || Kitt Peak || Spacewatch || — || align=right | 2.2 km || 
|-id=645 bgcolor=#fefefe
| 114645 ||  || — || March 8, 2003 || Anderson Mesa || LONEOS || H || align=right | 1.5 km || 
|-id=646 bgcolor=#d6d6d6
| 114646 ||  || — || March 6, 2003 || Socorro || LINEAR || — || align=right | 5.3 km || 
|-id=647 bgcolor=#d6d6d6
| 114647 ||  || — || March 7, 2003 || Anderson Mesa || LONEOS || ALA || align=right | 11 km || 
|-id=648 bgcolor=#E9E9E9
| 114648 ||  || — || March 7, 2003 || Socorro || LINEAR || — || align=right | 4.7 km || 
|-id=649 bgcolor=#d6d6d6
| 114649 Jeanneacker ||  ||  || March 6, 2003 || Saint-Sulpice || B. Christophe || — || align=right | 6.5 km || 
|-id=650 bgcolor=#d6d6d6
| 114650 ||  || — || March 8, 2003 || Socorro || LINEAR || — || align=right | 8.2 km || 
|-id=651 bgcolor=#E9E9E9
| 114651 ||  || — || March 8, 2003 || Socorro || LINEAR || — || align=right | 4.0 km || 
|-id=652 bgcolor=#fefefe
| 114652 ||  || — || March 11, 2003 || Socorro || LINEAR || — || align=right | 3.3 km || 
|-id=653 bgcolor=#fefefe
| 114653 ||  || — || March 9, 2003 || Socorro || LINEAR || CHL || align=right | 4.2 km || 
|-id=654 bgcolor=#E9E9E9
| 114654 ||  || — || March 9, 2003 || Socorro || LINEAR || — || align=right | 7.1 km || 
|-id=655 bgcolor=#fefefe
| 114655 ||  || — || March 9, 2003 || Socorro || LINEAR || H || align=right | 1.5 km || 
|-id=656 bgcolor=#E9E9E9
| 114656 ||  || — || March 24, 2003 || Socorro || LINEAR || — || align=right | 6.8 km || 
|-id=657 bgcolor=#d6d6d6
| 114657 ||  || — || March 24, 2003 || Socorro || LINEAR || — || align=right | 7.6 km || 
|-id=658 bgcolor=#d6d6d6
| 114658 ||  || — || March 27, 2003 || Needville || L. Casady, P. Garossino || THM || align=right | 5.2 km || 
|-id=659 bgcolor=#fefefe
| 114659 Sajnovics ||  ||  || March 28, 2003 || Piszkéstető || K. Sárneczky || — || align=right | 1.5 km || 
|-id=660 bgcolor=#d6d6d6
| 114660 ||  || — || March 30, 2003 || Nashville || R. Clingan || — || align=right | 4.1 km || 
|-id=661 bgcolor=#fefefe
| 114661 ||  || — || March 23, 2003 || Kitt Peak || Spacewatch || — || align=right | 1.3 km || 
|-id=662 bgcolor=#d6d6d6
| 114662 ||  || — || March 23, 2003 || Kitt Peak || Spacewatch || KOR || align=right | 2.3 km || 
|-id=663 bgcolor=#d6d6d6
| 114663 ||  || — || March 23, 2003 || Catalina || CSS || HYG || align=right | 6.1 km || 
|-id=664 bgcolor=#d6d6d6
| 114664 ||  || — || March 23, 2003 || Kitt Peak || Spacewatch || SAN || align=right | 2.6 km || 
|-id=665 bgcolor=#fefefe
| 114665 ||  || — || March 24, 2003 || Haleakala || NEAT || V || align=right | 1.3 km || 
|-id=666 bgcolor=#d6d6d6
| 114666 ||  || — || March 23, 2003 || Kitt Peak || Spacewatch || — || align=right | 6.4 km || 
|-id=667 bgcolor=#E9E9E9
| 114667 ||  || — || March 23, 2003 || Kitt Peak || Spacewatch || — || align=right | 6.3 km || 
|-id=668 bgcolor=#d6d6d6
| 114668 ||  || — || March 23, 2003 || Kitt Peak || Spacewatch || THM || align=right | 6.0 km || 
|-id=669 bgcolor=#d6d6d6
| 114669 ||  || — || March 23, 2003 || Kitt Peak || Spacewatch || THM || align=right | 6.1 km || 
|-id=670 bgcolor=#E9E9E9
| 114670 ||  || — || March 23, 2003 || Haleakala || NEAT || — || align=right | 4.3 km || 
|-id=671 bgcolor=#d6d6d6
| 114671 ||  || — || March 24, 2003 || Kitt Peak || Spacewatch || — || align=right | 4.3 km || 
|-id=672 bgcolor=#E9E9E9
| 114672 ||  || — || March 24, 2003 || Kitt Peak || Spacewatch || — || align=right | 5.2 km || 
|-id=673 bgcolor=#d6d6d6
| 114673 ||  || — || March 24, 2003 || Kitt Peak || Spacewatch || KOR || align=right | 2.9 km || 
|-id=674 bgcolor=#d6d6d6
| 114674 ||  || — || March 24, 2003 || Haleakala || NEAT || EOS || align=right | 3.7 km || 
|-id=675 bgcolor=#d6d6d6
| 114675 ||  || — || March 24, 2003 || Haleakala || NEAT || — || align=right | 7.7 km || 
|-id=676 bgcolor=#d6d6d6
| 114676 ||  || — || March 24, 2003 || Haleakala || NEAT || — || align=right | 7.3 km || 
|-id=677 bgcolor=#d6d6d6
| 114677 ||  || — || March 25, 2003 || Palomar || NEAT || — || align=right | 4.6 km || 
|-id=678 bgcolor=#fefefe
| 114678 ||  || — || March 25, 2003 || Kitt Peak || Spacewatch || — || align=right | 1.8 km || 
|-id=679 bgcolor=#d6d6d6
| 114679 ||  || — || March 25, 2003 || Haleakala || NEAT || THM || align=right | 4.3 km || 
|-id=680 bgcolor=#d6d6d6
| 114680 ||  || — || March 26, 2003 || Kitt Peak || Spacewatch || THM || align=right | 5.8 km || 
|-id=681 bgcolor=#d6d6d6
| 114681 ||  || — || March 26, 2003 || Kitt Peak || Spacewatch || THM || align=right | 3.2 km || 
|-id=682 bgcolor=#fefefe
| 114682 ||  || — || March 26, 2003 || Palomar || NEAT || — || align=right | 3.4 km || 
|-id=683 bgcolor=#fefefe
| 114683 ||  || — || March 26, 2003 || Haleakala || NEAT || — || align=right | 1.4 km || 
|-id=684 bgcolor=#d6d6d6
| 114684 ||  || — || March 27, 2003 || Palomar || NEAT || — || align=right | 8.4 km || 
|-id=685 bgcolor=#fefefe
| 114685 ||  || — || March 27, 2003 || Kitt Peak || Spacewatch || — || align=right | 1.9 km || 
|-id=686 bgcolor=#E9E9E9
| 114686 ||  || — || March 27, 2003 || Socorro || LINEAR || — || align=right | 4.9 km || 
|-id=687 bgcolor=#E9E9E9
| 114687 ||  || — || March 27, 2003 || Socorro || LINEAR || — || align=right | 2.2 km || 
|-id=688 bgcolor=#E9E9E9
| 114688 ||  || — || March 27, 2003 || Catalina || CSS || — || align=right | 3.3 km || 
|-id=689 bgcolor=#E9E9E9
| 114689 Tomstevens ||  ||  || March 28, 2003 || Needville || J. Dellinger || — || align=right | 4.0 km || 
|-id=690 bgcolor=#fefefe
| 114690 ||  || — || March 28, 2003 || Catalina || CSS || FLO || align=right | 1.4 km || 
|-id=691 bgcolor=#fefefe
| 114691 ||  || — || March 28, 2003 || Kitt Peak || Spacewatch || FLO || align=right | 1.3 km || 
|-id=692 bgcolor=#fefefe
| 114692 ||  || — || March 29, 2003 || Anderson Mesa || LONEOS || FLO || align=right | 2.2 km || 
|-id=693 bgcolor=#E9E9E9
| 114693 ||  || — || March 29, 2003 || Anderson Mesa || LONEOS || — || align=right | 6.2 km || 
|-id=694 bgcolor=#C2FFFF
| 114694 ||  || — || March 30, 2003 || Socorro || LINEAR || L4 || align=right | 22 km || 
|-id=695 bgcolor=#fefefe
| 114695 ||  || — || March 31, 2003 || Socorro || LINEAR || FLO || align=right | 1.7 km || 
|-id=696 bgcolor=#fefefe
| 114696 ||  || — || March 27, 2003 || Anderson Mesa || LONEOS || — || align=right | 2.2 km || 
|-id=697 bgcolor=#d6d6d6
| 114697 ||  || — || March 28, 2003 || Kitt Peak || Spacewatch || — || align=right | 6.3 km || 
|-id=698 bgcolor=#E9E9E9
| 114698 ||  || — || March 31, 2003 || Kitt Peak || Spacewatch || — || align=right | 6.0 km || 
|-id=699 bgcolor=#fefefe
| 114699 ||  || — || March 31, 2003 || Socorro || LINEAR || FLO || align=right | 1.4 km || 
|-id=700 bgcolor=#d6d6d6
| 114700 ||  || — || March 31, 2003 || Socorro || LINEAR || — || align=right | 7.6 km || 
|}

114701–114800 

|-bgcolor=#fefefe
| 114701 ||  || — || March 23, 2003 || Kitt Peak || Spacewatch || — || align=right | 1.4 km || 
|-id=702 bgcolor=#E9E9E9
| 114702 ||  || — || March 26, 2003 || Anderson Mesa || LONEOS || — || align=right | 4.9 km || 
|-id=703 bgcolor=#d6d6d6
| 114703 North Dakota ||  ||  || March 24, 2003 || Goodricke-Pigott || V. Reddy || KOR || align=right | 3.1 km || 
|-id=704 bgcolor=#d6d6d6
| 114704 ||  || — || March 25, 2003 || Anderson Mesa || LONEOS || — || align=right | 3.8 km || 
|-id=705 bgcolor=#d6d6d6
| 114705 Tamayo ||  ||  || March 30, 2003 || Kitt Peak || M. W. Buie || — || align=right | 5.6 km || 
|-id=706 bgcolor=#E9E9E9
| 114706 ||  || — || April 1, 2003 || Socorro || LINEAR || CLO || align=right | 5.4 km || 
|-id=707 bgcolor=#d6d6d6
| 114707 ||  || — || April 1, 2003 || Anderson Mesa || LONEOS || ALA || align=right | 8.4 km || 
|-id=708 bgcolor=#fefefe
| 114708 ||  || — || April 1, 2003 || Socorro || LINEAR || — || align=right | 1.9 km || 
|-id=709 bgcolor=#E9E9E9
| 114709 ||  || — || April 1, 2003 || Socorro || LINEAR || — || align=right | 6.5 km || 
|-id=710 bgcolor=#C2FFFF
| 114710 ||  || — || April 3, 2003 || Anderson Mesa || LONEOS || L4 || align=right | 18 km || 
|-id=711 bgcolor=#E9E9E9
| 114711 ||  || — || April 2, 2003 || Socorro || LINEAR || — || align=right | 4.4 km || 
|-id=712 bgcolor=#d6d6d6
| 114712 ||  || — || April 2, 2003 || Socorro || LINEAR || EUP || align=right | 7.9 km || 
|-id=713 bgcolor=#E9E9E9
| 114713 ||  || — || April 2, 2003 || Palomar || NEAT || — || align=right | 3.7 km || 
|-id=714 bgcolor=#d6d6d6
| 114714 ||  || — || April 4, 2003 || Kitt Peak || Spacewatch || EOS || align=right | 3.3 km || 
|-id=715 bgcolor=#d6d6d6
| 114715 ||  || — || April 3, 2003 || Anderson Mesa || LONEOS || — || align=right | 4.5 km || 
|-id=716 bgcolor=#fefefe
| 114716 ||  || — || April 6, 2003 || Socorro || LINEAR || H || align=right | 1.1 km || 
|-id=717 bgcolor=#d6d6d6
| 114717 ||  || — || April 4, 2003 || Kitt Peak || Spacewatch || — || align=right | 5.4 km || 
|-id=718 bgcolor=#d6d6d6
| 114718 ||  || — || April 4, 2003 || Anderson Mesa || LONEOS || — || align=right | 3.8 km || 
|-id=719 bgcolor=#d6d6d6
| 114719 ||  || — || April 8, 2003 || Kitt Peak || Spacewatch || — || align=right | 5.8 km || 
|-id=720 bgcolor=#E9E9E9
| 114720 ||  || — || April 8, 2003 || Socorro || LINEAR || HNS || align=right | 2.0 km || 
|-id=721 bgcolor=#d6d6d6
| 114721 ||  || — || April 8, 2003 || Socorro || LINEAR || — || align=right | 5.4 km || 
|-id=722 bgcolor=#d6d6d6
| 114722 ||  || — || April 3, 2003 || Cerro Tololo || DLS || — || align=right | 3.8 km || 
|-id=723 bgcolor=#d6d6d6
| 114723 ||  || — || April 7, 2003 || Kitt Peak || Spacewatch || EOS || align=right | 3.5 km || 
|-id=724 bgcolor=#E9E9E9
| 114724 ||  || — || April 5, 2003 || Socorro || LINEAR || — || align=right | 2.8 km || 
|-id=725 bgcolor=#d6d6d6
| 114725 Gordonwalker ||  ||  || April 6, 2003 || Anderson Mesa || LONEOS || ALA || align=right | 7.1 km || 
|-id=726 bgcolor=#d6d6d6
| 114726 ||  || — || April 21, 2003 || Catalina || CSS || — || align=right | 4.4 km || 
|-id=727 bgcolor=#d6d6d6
| 114727 ||  || — || April 24, 2003 || Anderson Mesa || LONEOS || HYG || align=right | 6.4 km || 
|-id=728 bgcolor=#fefefe
| 114728 ||  || — || April 24, 2003 || Anderson Mesa || LONEOS || — || align=right | 2.1 km || 
|-id=729 bgcolor=#fefefe
| 114729 ||  || — || April 25, 2003 || Nashville || R. Clingan || V || align=right | 1.1 km || 
|-id=730 bgcolor=#d6d6d6
| 114730 ||  || — || April 25, 2003 || Kitt Peak || Spacewatch || KAR || align=right | 2.1 km || 
|-id=731 bgcolor=#d6d6d6
| 114731 ||  || — || April 24, 2003 || Anderson Mesa || LONEOS || — || align=right | 5.8 km || 
|-id=732 bgcolor=#fefefe
| 114732 ||  || — || April 24, 2003 || Anderson Mesa || LONEOS || — || align=right | 2.3 km || 
|-id=733 bgcolor=#d6d6d6
| 114733 ||  || — || April 24, 2003 || Anderson Mesa || LONEOS || — || align=right | 7.9 km || 
|-id=734 bgcolor=#E9E9E9
| 114734 ||  || — || April 24, 2003 || Anderson Mesa || LONEOS || — || align=right | 3.6 km || 
|-id=735 bgcolor=#d6d6d6
| 114735 Irenemagni ||  ||  || April 24, 2003 || Campo Imperatore || F. Bernardi || URS || align=right | 7.1 km || 
|-id=736 bgcolor=#E9E9E9
| 114736 ||  || — || April 25, 2003 || Kitt Peak || Spacewatch || — || align=right | 4.5 km || 
|-id=737 bgcolor=#E9E9E9
| 114737 ||  || — || April 25, 2003 || Anderson Mesa || LONEOS || RAF || align=right | 1.9 km || 
|-id=738 bgcolor=#fefefe
| 114738 ||  || — || April 23, 2003 || Campo Imperatore || CINEOS || V || align=right | 1.4 km || 
|-id=739 bgcolor=#d6d6d6
| 114739 ||  || — || April 23, 2003 || Campo Imperatore || CINEOS || — || align=right | 6.9 km || 
|-id=740 bgcolor=#d6d6d6
| 114740 ||  || — || April 25, 2003 || Campo Imperatore || CINEOS || — || align=right | 6.6 km || 
|-id=741 bgcolor=#E9E9E9
| 114741 ||  || — || April 26, 2003 || Socorro || LINEAR || — || align=right | 3.0 km || 
|-id=742 bgcolor=#fefefe
| 114742 ||  || — || April 24, 2003 || Socorro || LINEAR || H || align=right | 1.00 km || 
|-id=743 bgcolor=#d6d6d6
| 114743 ||  || — || April 24, 2003 || Anderson Mesa || LONEOS || — || align=right | 5.2 km || 
|-id=744 bgcolor=#E9E9E9
| 114744 ||  || — || April 24, 2003 || Anderson Mesa || LONEOS || — || align=right | 2.0 km || 
|-id=745 bgcolor=#fefefe
| 114745 ||  || — || April 25, 2003 || Kitt Peak || Spacewatch || FLO || align=right | 1.7 km || 
|-id=746 bgcolor=#fefefe
| 114746 ||  || — || April 26, 2003 || Haleakala || NEAT || — || align=right | 1.9 km || 
|-id=747 bgcolor=#d6d6d6
| 114747 ||  || — || April 27, 2003 || Anderson Mesa || LONEOS || — || align=right | 5.3 km || 
|-id=748 bgcolor=#d6d6d6
| 114748 ||  || — || April 26, 2003 || Haleakala || NEAT || URS || align=right | 5.2 km || 
|-id=749 bgcolor=#d6d6d6
| 114749 ||  || — || April 28, 2003 || Anderson Mesa || LONEOS || HIL3:2 || align=right | 10 km || 
|-id=750 bgcolor=#fefefe
| 114750 ||  || — || April 29, 2003 || Socorro || LINEAR || — || align=right | 1.9 km || 
|-id=751 bgcolor=#E9E9E9
| 114751 ||  || — || April 29, 2003 || Haleakala || NEAT || — || align=right | 2.4 km || 
|-id=752 bgcolor=#E9E9E9
| 114752 ||  || — || April 29, 2003 || Haleakala || NEAT || — || align=right | 4.8 km || 
|-id=753 bgcolor=#d6d6d6
| 114753 ||  || — || April 28, 2003 || Nogales || M. Schwartz, P. R. Holvorcem || ALA || align=right | 7.2 km || 
|-id=754 bgcolor=#E9E9E9
| 114754 ||  || — || April 29, 2003 || Reedy Creek || J. Broughton || — || align=right | 3.2 km || 
|-id=755 bgcolor=#E9E9E9
| 114755 ||  || — || April 28, 2003 || Kitt Peak || Spacewatch || — || align=right | 3.6 km || 
|-id=756 bgcolor=#E9E9E9
| 114756 ||  || — || April 29, 2003 || Socorro || LINEAR || — || align=right | 1.7 km || 
|-id=757 bgcolor=#d6d6d6
| 114757 ||  || — || April 29, 2003 || Socorro || LINEAR || — || align=right | 6.8 km || 
|-id=758 bgcolor=#d6d6d6
| 114758 ||  || — || April 28, 2003 || Anderson Mesa || LONEOS || — || align=right | 5.8 km || 
|-id=759 bgcolor=#E9E9E9
| 114759 ||  || — || April 28, 2003 || Socorro || LINEAR || — || align=right | 3.8 km || 
|-id=760 bgcolor=#E9E9E9
| 114760 ||  || — || April 28, 2003 || Socorro || LINEAR || — || align=right | 3.5 km || 
|-id=761 bgcolor=#d6d6d6
| 114761 ||  || — || April 29, 2003 || Anderson Mesa || LONEOS || — || align=right | 4.8 km || 
|-id=762 bgcolor=#E9E9E9
| 114762 ||  || — || April 24, 2003 || Anderson Mesa || LONEOS || — || align=right | 2.4 km || 
|-id=763 bgcolor=#E9E9E9
| 114763 ||  || — || May 1, 2003 || Kitt Peak || Spacewatch || — || align=right | 2.7 km || 
|-id=764 bgcolor=#fefefe
| 114764 ||  || — || May 1, 2003 || Socorro || LINEAR || — || align=right | 1.6 km || 
|-id=765 bgcolor=#fefefe
| 114765 ||  || — || May 1, 2003 || Socorro || LINEAR || NYS || align=right | 1.2 km || 
|-id=766 bgcolor=#FA8072
| 114766 ||  || — || May 2, 2003 || Socorro || LINEAR || H || align=right | 1.2 km || 
|-id=767 bgcolor=#d6d6d6
| 114767 ||  || — || May 2, 2003 || Reedy Creek || J. Broughton || — || align=right | 5.1 km || 
|-id=768 bgcolor=#d6d6d6
| 114768 ||  || — || May 5, 2003 || Kitt Peak || Spacewatch || — || align=right | 5.0 km || 
|-id=769 bgcolor=#E9E9E9
| 114769 ||  || — || May 6, 2003 || Kitt Peak || Spacewatch || — || align=right | 2.5 km || 
|-id=770 bgcolor=#E9E9E9
| 114770 ||  || — || May 1, 2003 || Kitt Peak || Spacewatch || — || align=right | 4.6 km || 
|-id=771 bgcolor=#fefefe
| 114771 ||  || — || May 10, 2003 || Reedy Creek || J. Broughton || — || align=right | 2.1 km || 
|-id=772 bgcolor=#E9E9E9
| 114772 ||  || — || May 24, 2003 || Reedy Creek || J. Broughton || MAR || align=right | 3.1 km || 
|-id=773 bgcolor=#fefefe
| 114773 ||  || — || May 24, 2003 || Reedy Creek || J. Broughton || PHO || align=right | 5.8 km || 
|-id=774 bgcolor=#d6d6d6
| 114774 ||  || — || May 27, 2003 || Socorro || LINEAR || PAL || align=right | 6.5 km || 
|-id=775 bgcolor=#d6d6d6
| 114775 ||  || — || May 25, 2003 || Kitt Peak || Spacewatch || — || align=right | 3.7 km || 
|-id=776 bgcolor=#E9E9E9
| 114776 || 2003 MJ || — || June 20, 2003 || Reedy Creek || J. Broughton || — || align=right | 2.2 km || 
|-id=777 bgcolor=#d6d6d6
| 114777 ||  || — || June 23, 2003 || Anderson Mesa || LONEOS || — || align=right | 5.7 km || 
|-id=778 bgcolor=#fefefe
| 114778 ||  || — || June 22, 2003 || Anderson Mesa || LONEOS || V || align=right | 1.5 km || 
|-id=779 bgcolor=#E9E9E9
| 114779 ||  || — || June 25, 2003 || Haleakala || NEAT || — || align=right | 2.7 km || 
|-id=780 bgcolor=#fefefe
| 114780 ||  || — || June 25, 2003 || Socorro || LINEAR || — || align=right | 1.4 km || 
|-id=781 bgcolor=#fefefe
| 114781 ||  || — || June 25, 2003 || Socorro || LINEAR || — || align=right | 1.7 km || 
|-id=782 bgcolor=#E9E9E9
| 114782 ||  || — || June 26, 2003 || Socorro || LINEAR || — || align=right | 1.8 km || 
|-id=783 bgcolor=#E9E9E9
| 114783 ||  || — || June 26, 2003 || Socorro || LINEAR || — || align=right | 3.3 km || 
|-id=784 bgcolor=#fefefe
| 114784 ||  || — || June 26, 2003 || Haleakala || NEAT || — || align=right | 1.7 km || 
|-id=785 bgcolor=#fefefe
| 114785 ||  || — || June 26, 2003 || Haleakala || NEAT || — || align=right | 2.1 km || 
|-id=786 bgcolor=#d6d6d6
| 114786 ||  || — || June 26, 2003 || Socorro || LINEAR || MEL || align=right | 9.4 km || 
|-id=787 bgcolor=#fefefe
| 114787 ||  || — || June 29, 2003 || Reedy Creek || J. Broughton || ERI || align=right | 3.9 km || 
|-id=788 bgcolor=#fefefe
| 114788 ||  || — || June 29, 2003 || Reedy Creek || J. Broughton || V || align=right | 1.5 km || 
|-id=789 bgcolor=#E9E9E9
| 114789 ||  || — || June 26, 2003 || Socorro || LINEAR || — || align=right | 4.2 km || 
|-id=790 bgcolor=#E9E9E9
| 114790 ||  || — || June 27, 2003 || Socorro || LINEAR || — || align=right | 6.1 km || 
|-id=791 bgcolor=#d6d6d6
| 114791 ||  || — || June 29, 2003 || Socorro || LINEAR || — || align=right | 8.2 km || 
|-id=792 bgcolor=#fefefe
| 114792 ||  || — || June 30, 2003 || Socorro || LINEAR || H || align=right | 1.1 km || 
|-id=793 bgcolor=#fefefe
| 114793 ||  || — || July 1, 2003 || Socorro || LINEAR || — || align=right | 2.6 km || 
|-id=794 bgcolor=#d6d6d6
| 114794 ||  || — || July 1, 2003 || Socorro || LINEAR || — || align=right | 4.8 km || 
|-id=795 bgcolor=#E9E9E9
| 114795 ||  || — || July 2, 2003 || Socorro || LINEAR || — || align=right | 2.0 km || 
|-id=796 bgcolor=#E9E9E9
| 114796 ||  || — || July 3, 2003 || Reedy Creek || J. Broughton || — || align=right | 2.0 km || 
|-id=797 bgcolor=#fefefe
| 114797 ||  || — || July 4, 2003 || Anderson Mesa || LONEOS || H || align=right | 1.4 km || 
|-id=798 bgcolor=#E9E9E9
| 114798 ||  || — || July 3, 2003 || Kitt Peak || Spacewatch || — || align=right | 1.9 km || 
|-id=799 bgcolor=#E9E9E9
| 114799 ||  || — || July 8, 2003 || Anderson Mesa || LONEOS || — || align=right | 6.5 km || 
|-id=800 bgcolor=#FA8072
| 114800 ||  || — || July 8, 2003 || Anderson Mesa || LONEOS || — || align=right | 1.5 km || 
|}

114801–114900 

|-bgcolor=#d6d6d6
| 114801 ||  || — || July 8, 2003 || Palomar || NEAT || — || align=right | 3.8 km || 
|-id=802 bgcolor=#E9E9E9
| 114802 ||  || — || July 1, 2003 || Socorro || LINEAR || — || align=right | 2.8 km || 
|-id=803 bgcolor=#fefefe
| 114803 ||  || — || July 10, 2003 || Haleakala || NEAT || NYS || align=right | 1.6 km || 
|-id=804 bgcolor=#d6d6d6
| 114804 ||  || — || July 10, 2003 || Haleakala || NEAT || 7:4 || align=right | 9.2 km || 
|-id=805 bgcolor=#E9E9E9
| 114805 ||  || — || July 3, 2003 || Kitt Peak || Spacewatch || ADE || align=right | 4.1 km || 
|-id=806 bgcolor=#fefefe
| 114806 || 2003 OR || — || July 20, 2003 || Reedy Creek || J. Broughton || NYS || align=right | 1.4 km || 
|-id=807 bgcolor=#d6d6d6
| 114807 ||  || — || July 20, 2003 || Palomar || NEAT || — || align=right | 7.7 km || 
|-id=808 bgcolor=#d6d6d6
| 114808 ||  || — || July 22, 2003 || Haleakala || NEAT || CRO || align=right | 6.8 km || 
|-id=809 bgcolor=#E9E9E9
| 114809 ||  || — || July 22, 2003 || Haleakala || NEAT || ADE || align=right | 3.7 km || 
|-id=810 bgcolor=#fefefe
| 114810 ||  || — || July 24, 2003 || Reedy Creek || J. Broughton || MAS || align=right | 1.4 km || 
|-id=811 bgcolor=#E9E9E9
| 114811 ||  || — || July 24, 2003 || Reedy Creek || J. Broughton || — || align=right | 2.1 km || 
|-id=812 bgcolor=#E9E9E9
| 114812 ||  || — || July 24, 2003 || Reedy Creek || J. Broughton || — || align=right | 3.4 km || 
|-id=813 bgcolor=#fefefe
| 114813 ||  || — || July 24, 2003 || Campo Imperatore || CINEOS || — || align=right | 1.8 km || 
|-id=814 bgcolor=#d6d6d6
| 114814 ||  || — || July 23, 2003 || Palomar || NEAT || FIR || align=right | 7.2 km || 
|-id=815 bgcolor=#E9E9E9
| 114815 ||  || — || July 24, 2003 || Campo Imperatore || CINEOS || — || align=right | 2.3 km || 
|-id=816 bgcolor=#d6d6d6
| 114816 ||  || — || July 25, 2003 || Socorro || LINEAR || — || align=right | 6.2 km || 
|-id=817 bgcolor=#E9E9E9
| 114817 ||  || — || July 26, 2003 || Palomar || NEAT || — || align=right | 6.3 km || 
|-id=818 bgcolor=#fefefe
| 114818 ||  || — || July 27, 2003 || Reedy Creek || J. Broughton || NYS || align=right | 1.3 km || 
|-id=819 bgcolor=#E9E9E9
| 114819 ||  || — || July 20, 2003 || Palomar || NEAT || — || align=right | 3.3 km || 
|-id=820 bgcolor=#E9E9E9
| 114820 ||  || — || July 28, 2003 || Palomar || NEAT || GAL || align=right | 3.4 km || 
|-id=821 bgcolor=#d6d6d6
| 114821 ||  || — || July 28, 2003 || Palomar || NEAT || — || align=right | 6.8 km || 
|-id=822 bgcolor=#E9E9E9
| 114822 ||  || — || July 23, 2003 || Palomar || NEAT || GAL || align=right | 3.3 km || 
|-id=823 bgcolor=#d6d6d6
| 114823 ||  || — || July 23, 2003 || Palomar || NEAT || EOS || align=right | 5.1 km || 
|-id=824 bgcolor=#FA8072
| 114824 ||  || — || July 29, 2003 || Campo Imperatore || CINEOS || — || align=right | 1.2 km || 
|-id=825 bgcolor=#d6d6d6
| 114825 ||  || — || July 29, 2003 || Campo Imperatore || CINEOS || HYG || align=right | 5.7 km || 
|-id=826 bgcolor=#fefefe
| 114826 ||  || — || July 29, 2003 || Reedy Creek || J. Broughton || NYS || align=right | 1.6 km || 
|-id=827 bgcolor=#E9E9E9
| 114827 ||  || — || July 30, 2003 || Palomar || NEAT || — || align=right | 5.6 km || 
|-id=828 bgcolor=#fefefe
| 114828 Ricoromita ||  ||  || July 30, 2003 || Campo Imperatore || CINEOS || — || align=right | 1.9 km || 
|-id=829 bgcolor=#E9E9E9
| 114829 Chierchia ||  ||  || July 23, 2003 || Campo Imperatore || CINEOS || EUN || align=right | 2.8 km || 
|-id=830 bgcolor=#d6d6d6
| 114830 ||  || — || July 29, 2003 || Socorro || LINEAR || SHU3:2 || align=right | 12 km || 
|-id=831 bgcolor=#E9E9E9
| 114831 ||  || — || July 29, 2003 || Socorro || LINEAR || GEF || align=right | 2.9 km || 
|-id=832 bgcolor=#fefefe
| 114832 ||  || — || July 30, 2003 || Socorro || LINEAR || FLO || align=right | 1.3 km || 
|-id=833 bgcolor=#fefefe
| 114833 ||  || — || July 30, 2003 || Socorro || LINEAR || — || align=right | 1.5 km || 
|-id=834 bgcolor=#fefefe
| 114834 ||  || — || July 30, 2003 || Socorro || LINEAR || V || align=right | 1.5 km || 
|-id=835 bgcolor=#E9E9E9
| 114835 ||  || — || July 24, 2003 || Palomar || NEAT || EUN || align=right | 1.7 km || 
|-id=836 bgcolor=#fefefe
| 114836 ||  || — || July 24, 2003 || Palomar || NEAT || — || align=right | 1.9 km || 
|-id=837 bgcolor=#d6d6d6
| 114837 ||  || — || July 24, 2003 || Palomar || NEAT || 3:2 || align=right | 11 km || 
|-id=838 bgcolor=#E9E9E9
| 114838 ||  || — || July 24, 2003 || Palomar || NEAT || RAF || align=right | 1.7 km || 
|-id=839 bgcolor=#fefefe
| 114839 ||  || — || July 24, 2003 || Palomar || NEAT || — || align=right | 2.0 km || 
|-id=840 bgcolor=#fefefe
| 114840 ||  || — || July 30, 2003 || Socorro || LINEAR || V || align=right | 1.5 km || 
|-id=841 bgcolor=#E9E9E9
| 114841 || 2003 PF || — || August 1, 2003 || Reedy Creek || J. Broughton || — || align=right | 2.2 km || 
|-id=842 bgcolor=#d6d6d6
| 114842 ||  || — || August 1, 2003 || Haleakala || NEAT || EOS || align=right | 3.8 km || 
|-id=843 bgcolor=#d6d6d6
| 114843 ||  || — || August 1, 2003 || Haleakala || NEAT || — || align=right | 6.6 km || 
|-id=844 bgcolor=#fefefe
| 114844 ||  || — || August 1, 2003 || Haleakala || NEAT || — || align=right | 1.6 km || 
|-id=845 bgcolor=#fefefe
| 114845 ||  || — || August 2, 2003 || Haleakala || NEAT || NYS || align=right | 1.3 km || 
|-id=846 bgcolor=#fefefe
| 114846 ||  || — || August 2, 2003 || Haleakala || NEAT || FLO || align=right | 1.5 km || 
|-id=847 bgcolor=#E9E9E9
| 114847 ||  || — || August 2, 2003 || Haleakala || NEAT || — || align=right | 2.4 km || 
|-id=848 bgcolor=#fefefe
| 114848 ||  || — || August 2, 2003 || Haleakala || NEAT || FLO || align=right | 1.5 km || 
|-id=849 bgcolor=#fefefe
| 114849 ||  || — || August 3, 2003 || Haleakala || NEAT || — || align=right | 1.4 km || 
|-id=850 bgcolor=#d6d6d6
| 114850 ||  || — || August 4, 2003 || Socorro || LINEAR || — || align=right | 5.5 km || 
|-id=851 bgcolor=#fefefe
| 114851 ||  || — || August 1, 2003 || Socorro || LINEAR || V || align=right | 1.0 km || 
|-id=852 bgcolor=#d6d6d6
| 114852 ||  || — || August 1, 2003 || Socorro || LINEAR || — || align=right | 3.2 km || 
|-id=853 bgcolor=#E9E9E9
| 114853 ||  || — || August 1, 2003 || Socorro || LINEAR || — || align=right | 5.5 km || 
|-id=854 bgcolor=#E9E9E9
| 114854 ||  || — || August 2, 2003 || Haleakala || NEAT || — || align=right | 2.0 km || 
|-id=855 bgcolor=#fefefe
| 114855 ||  || — || August 2, 2003 || Haleakala || NEAT || — || align=right | 1.5 km || 
|-id=856 bgcolor=#fefefe
| 114856 ||  || — || August 4, 2003 || Socorro || LINEAR || NYS || align=right | 1.2 km || 
|-id=857 bgcolor=#fefefe
| 114857 ||  || — || August 4, 2003 || Socorro || LINEAR || V || align=right | 1.3 km || 
|-id=858 bgcolor=#fefefe
| 114858 ||  || — || August 4, 2003 || Socorro || LINEAR || — || align=right | 1.6 km || 
|-id=859 bgcolor=#E9E9E9
| 114859 ||  || — || August 7, 2003 || Haleakala || NEAT || HNS || align=right | 3.4 km || 
|-id=860 bgcolor=#fefefe
| 114860 || 2003 QB || — || July 24, 2003 || Palomar || NEAT || — || align=right | 1.4 km || 
|-id=861 bgcolor=#fefefe
| 114861 || 2003 QD || — || August 17, 2003 || Needville || Needville Obs. || — || align=right | 2.9 km || 
|-id=862 bgcolor=#E9E9E9
| 114862 ||  || — || August 19, 2003 || Campo Imperatore || CINEOS || — || align=right | 3.2 km || 
|-id=863 bgcolor=#d6d6d6
| 114863 ||  || — || August 19, 2003 || Campo Imperatore || CINEOS || — || align=right | 4.8 km || 
|-id=864 bgcolor=#E9E9E9
| 114864 ||  || — || August 19, 2003 || Campo Imperatore || CINEOS || MAR || align=right | 2.0 km || 
|-id=865 bgcolor=#d6d6d6
| 114865 ||  || — || August 19, 2003 || Campo Imperatore || CINEOS || HYG || align=right | 5.5 km || 
|-id=866 bgcolor=#E9E9E9
| 114866 ||  || — || August 19, 2003 || Campo Imperatore || CINEOS || — || align=right | 3.3 km || 
|-id=867 bgcolor=#fefefe
| 114867 ||  || — || August 17, 2003 || Haleakala || NEAT || ERI || align=right | 4.5 km || 
|-id=868 bgcolor=#fefefe
| 114868 ||  || — || August 21, 2003 || Modra || Š. Gajdoš, J. Világi || — || align=right | 2.4 km || 
|-id=869 bgcolor=#E9E9E9
| 114869 ||  || — || August 18, 2003 || Campo Imperatore || CINEOS || HEN || align=right | 1.8 km || 
|-id=870 bgcolor=#d6d6d6
| 114870 ||  || — || August 20, 2003 || Campo Imperatore || CINEOS || — || align=right | 4.8 km || 
|-id=871 bgcolor=#E9E9E9
| 114871 ||  || — || August 21, 2003 || Palomar || NEAT || — || align=right | 3.4 km || 
|-id=872 bgcolor=#d6d6d6
| 114872 ||  || — || August 20, 2003 || Palomar || NEAT || — || align=right | 4.5 km || 
|-id=873 bgcolor=#d6d6d6
| 114873 ||  || — || August 20, 2003 || Reedy Creek || J. Broughton || — || align=right | 4.0 km || 
|-id=874 bgcolor=#E9E9E9
| 114874 ||  || — || August 20, 2003 || Campo Imperatore || CINEOS || — || align=right | 1.9 km || 
|-id=875 bgcolor=#fefefe
| 114875 ||  || — || August 21, 2003 || Needville || Needville Obs. || — || align=right | 1.8 km || 
|-id=876 bgcolor=#E9E9E9
| 114876 ||  || — || August 21, 2003 || Haleakala || NEAT || — || align=right | 4.7 km || 
|-id=877 bgcolor=#fefefe
| 114877 ||  || — || August 22, 2003 || Haleakala || NEAT || — || align=right | 1.9 km || 
|-id=878 bgcolor=#E9E9E9
| 114878 ||  || — || August 22, 2003 || Socorro || LINEAR || GAL || align=right | 3.0 km || 
|-id=879 bgcolor=#d6d6d6
| 114879 ||  || — || August 22, 2003 || Haleakala || NEAT || — || align=right | 5.5 km || 
|-id=880 bgcolor=#E9E9E9
| 114880 ||  || — || August 22, 2003 || Haleakala || NEAT || — || align=right | 4.9 km || 
|-id=881 bgcolor=#d6d6d6
| 114881 ||  || — || August 20, 2003 || Palomar || NEAT || — || align=right | 9.3 km || 
|-id=882 bgcolor=#d6d6d6
| 114882 ||  || — || August 20, 2003 || Palomar || NEAT || — || align=right | 5.5 km || 
|-id=883 bgcolor=#fefefe
| 114883 ||  || — || August 20, 2003 || Palomar || NEAT || V || align=right | 1.2 km || 
|-id=884 bgcolor=#d6d6d6
| 114884 ||  || — || August 20, 2003 || Palomar || NEAT || — || align=right | 2.8 km || 
|-id=885 bgcolor=#d6d6d6
| 114885 ||  || — || August 20, 2003 || Palomar || NEAT || — || align=right | 4.4 km || 
|-id=886 bgcolor=#d6d6d6
| 114886 ||  || — || August 20, 2003 || Campo Imperatore || CINEOS || — || align=right | 4.5 km || 
|-id=887 bgcolor=#fefefe
| 114887 ||  || — || August 21, 2003 || Palomar || NEAT || FLO || align=right | 1.4 km || 
|-id=888 bgcolor=#d6d6d6
| 114888 ||  || — || August 21, 2003 || Palomar || NEAT || — || align=right | 3.6 km || 
|-id=889 bgcolor=#fefefe
| 114889 ||  || — || August 22, 2003 || Palomar || NEAT || — || align=right | 1.5 km || 
|-id=890 bgcolor=#d6d6d6
| 114890 ||  || — || August 22, 2003 || Palomar || NEAT || TIR || align=right | 4.1 km || 
|-id=891 bgcolor=#d6d6d6
| 114891 ||  || — || August 22, 2003 || Palomar || NEAT || — || align=right | 5.4 km || 
|-id=892 bgcolor=#fefefe
| 114892 ||  || — || August 22, 2003 || Palomar || NEAT || — || align=right | 1.8 km || 
|-id=893 bgcolor=#E9E9E9
| 114893 ||  || — || August 22, 2003 || Palomar || NEAT || — || align=right | 5.8 km || 
|-id=894 bgcolor=#d6d6d6
| 114894 ||  || — || August 22, 2003 || Palomar || NEAT || TIR || align=right | 4.2 km || 
|-id=895 bgcolor=#d6d6d6
| 114895 ||  || — || August 22, 2003 || Palomar || NEAT || — || align=right | 4.1 km || 
|-id=896 bgcolor=#d6d6d6
| 114896 ||  || — || August 22, 2003 || Palomar || NEAT || — || align=right | 7.2 km || 
|-id=897 bgcolor=#E9E9E9
| 114897 ||  || — || August 20, 2003 || Palomar || NEAT || — || align=right | 5.1 km || 
|-id=898 bgcolor=#d6d6d6
| 114898 ||  || — || August 20, 2003 || Palomar || NEAT || — || align=right | 4.2 km || 
|-id=899 bgcolor=#E9E9E9
| 114899 ||  || — || August 21, 2003 || Haleakala || NEAT || — || align=right | 5.7 km || 
|-id=900 bgcolor=#E9E9E9
| 114900 ||  || — || August 22, 2003 || Campo Imperatore || CINEOS || — || align=right | 4.0 km || 
|}

114901–115000 

|-bgcolor=#fefefe
| 114901 ||  || — || August 22, 2003 || Palomar || NEAT || — || align=right | 3.2 km || 
|-id=902 bgcolor=#E9E9E9
| 114902 ||  || — || August 22, 2003 || Palomar || NEAT || ADE || align=right | 4.6 km || 
|-id=903 bgcolor=#fefefe
| 114903 ||  || — || August 22, 2003 || Palomar || NEAT || — || align=right | 1.2 km || 
|-id=904 bgcolor=#fefefe
| 114904 ||  || — || August 22, 2003 || Palomar || NEAT || V || align=right | 1.2 km || 
|-id=905 bgcolor=#E9E9E9
| 114905 ||  || — || August 22, 2003 || Haleakala || NEAT || GEF || align=right | 2.6 km || 
|-id=906 bgcolor=#fefefe
| 114906 ||  || — || August 23, 2003 || Palomar || NEAT || — || align=right | 1.4 km || 
|-id=907 bgcolor=#d6d6d6
| 114907 ||  || — || August 23, 2003 || Palomar || NEAT || — || align=right | 7.2 km || 
|-id=908 bgcolor=#E9E9E9
| 114908 ||  || — || August 23, 2003 || Socorro || LINEAR || — || align=right | 4.5 km || 
|-id=909 bgcolor=#d6d6d6
| 114909 ||  || — || August 20, 2003 || Palomar || NEAT || — || align=right | 7.3 km || 
|-id=910 bgcolor=#E9E9E9
| 114910 ||  || — || August 24, 2003 || Emerald Lane || L. Ball || DOR || align=right | 5.3 km || 
|-id=911 bgcolor=#d6d6d6
| 114911 ||  || — || August 23, 2003 || Socorro || LINEAR || BRA || align=right | 3.6 km || 
|-id=912 bgcolor=#FA8072
| 114912 ||  || — || August 23, 2003 || Socorro || LINEAR || H || align=right | 1.9 km || 
|-id=913 bgcolor=#fefefe
| 114913 ||  || — || August 22, 2003 || Socorro || LINEAR || NYS || align=right | 1.4 km || 
|-id=914 bgcolor=#E9E9E9
| 114914 ||  || — || August 22, 2003 || Palomar || NEAT || — || align=right | 4.2 km || 
|-id=915 bgcolor=#E9E9E9
| 114915 ||  || — || August 22, 2003 || Palomar || NEAT || EUN || align=right | 2.1 km || 
|-id=916 bgcolor=#fefefe
| 114916 ||  || — || August 22, 2003 || Socorro || LINEAR || MAS || align=right | 1.7 km || 
|-id=917 bgcolor=#E9E9E9
| 114917 ||  || — || August 22, 2003 || Socorro || LINEAR || — || align=right | 4.2 km || 
|-id=918 bgcolor=#fefefe
| 114918 ||  || — || August 22, 2003 || Socorro || LINEAR || V || align=right | 1.2 km || 
|-id=919 bgcolor=#fefefe
| 114919 ||  || — || August 22, 2003 || Socorro || LINEAR || — || align=right | 1.4 km || 
|-id=920 bgcolor=#E9E9E9
| 114920 ||  || — || August 22, 2003 || Socorro || LINEAR || DOR || align=right | 4.8 km || 
|-id=921 bgcolor=#fefefe
| 114921 ||  || — || August 22, 2003 || Socorro || LINEAR || — || align=right | 2.4 km || 
|-id=922 bgcolor=#fefefe
| 114922 ||  || — || August 22, 2003 || Socorro || LINEAR || MAS || align=right | 1.5 km || 
|-id=923 bgcolor=#fefefe
| 114923 ||  || — || August 22, 2003 || Socorro || LINEAR || — || align=right | 1.0 km || 
|-id=924 bgcolor=#FA8072
| 114924 ||  || — || August 22, 2003 || Socorro || LINEAR || — || align=right | 2.7 km || 
|-id=925 bgcolor=#fefefe
| 114925 ||  || — || August 22, 2003 || Socorro || LINEAR || — || align=right | 1.7 km || 
|-id=926 bgcolor=#d6d6d6
| 114926 ||  || — || August 22, 2003 || Socorro || LINEAR || — || align=right | 5.1 km || 
|-id=927 bgcolor=#fefefe
| 114927 ||  || — || August 22, 2003 || Palomar || NEAT || NYS || align=right | 1.3 km || 
|-id=928 bgcolor=#d6d6d6
| 114928 ||  || — || August 22, 2003 || Palomar || NEAT || — || align=right | 4.0 km || 
|-id=929 bgcolor=#fefefe
| 114929 ||  || — || August 22, 2003 || Haleakala || NEAT || — || align=right | 2.8 km || 
|-id=930 bgcolor=#E9E9E9
| 114930 ||  || — || August 23, 2003 || Palomar || NEAT || — || align=right | 4.8 km || 
|-id=931 bgcolor=#fefefe
| 114931 ||  || — || August 23, 2003 || Socorro || LINEAR || — || align=right | 1.6 km || 
|-id=932 bgcolor=#fefefe
| 114932 ||  || — || August 23, 2003 || Palomar || NEAT || NYS || align=right | 2.5 km || 
|-id=933 bgcolor=#fefefe
| 114933 ||  || — || August 23, 2003 || Socorro || LINEAR || ERI || align=right | 3.4 km || 
|-id=934 bgcolor=#fefefe
| 114934 ||  || — || August 20, 2003 || Palomar || NEAT || — || align=right | 2.1 km || 
|-id=935 bgcolor=#fefefe
| 114935 ||  || — || August 22, 2003 || Palomar || NEAT || — || align=right | 1.3 km || 
|-id=936 bgcolor=#fefefe
| 114936 ||  || — || August 22, 2003 || Palomar || NEAT || V || align=right | 1.3 km || 
|-id=937 bgcolor=#d6d6d6
| 114937 ||  || — || August 23, 2003 || Palomar || NEAT || 3:2 || align=right | 10 km || 
|-id=938 bgcolor=#d6d6d6
| 114938 ||  || — || August 23, 2003 || Palomar || NEAT || — || align=right | 7.1 km || 
|-id=939 bgcolor=#d6d6d6
| 114939 ||  || — || August 23, 2003 || Palomar || NEAT || HYG || align=right | 5.4 km || 
|-id=940 bgcolor=#fefefe
| 114940 ||  || — || August 23, 2003 || Socorro || LINEAR || NYS || align=right | 1.3 km || 
|-id=941 bgcolor=#fefefe
| 114941 ||  || — || August 23, 2003 || Socorro || LINEAR || — || align=right | 2.2 km || 
|-id=942 bgcolor=#fefefe
| 114942 ||  || — || August 23, 2003 || Socorro || LINEAR || NYS || align=right | 1.5 km || 
|-id=943 bgcolor=#fefefe
| 114943 ||  || — || August 23, 2003 || Socorro || LINEAR || NYS || align=right | 1.4 km || 
|-id=944 bgcolor=#fefefe
| 114944 ||  || — || August 23, 2003 || Socorro || LINEAR || — || align=right | 1.7 km || 
|-id=945 bgcolor=#E9E9E9
| 114945 ||  || — || August 23, 2003 || Socorro || LINEAR || DOR || align=right | 4.7 km || 
|-id=946 bgcolor=#fefefe
| 114946 ||  || — || August 23, 2003 || Socorro || LINEAR || NYS || align=right | 1.2 km || 
|-id=947 bgcolor=#fefefe
| 114947 ||  || — || August 23, 2003 || Socorro || LINEAR || V || align=right | 1.4 km || 
|-id=948 bgcolor=#fefefe
| 114948 ||  || — || August 23, 2003 || Socorro || LINEAR || NYS || align=right | 1.2 km || 
|-id=949 bgcolor=#fefefe
| 114949 ||  || — || August 23, 2003 || Socorro || LINEAR || — || align=right | 1.3 km || 
|-id=950 bgcolor=#fefefe
| 114950 ||  || — || August 23, 2003 || Socorro || LINEAR || V || align=right | 1.3 km || 
|-id=951 bgcolor=#fefefe
| 114951 ||  || — || August 23, 2003 || Socorro || LINEAR || — || align=right | 2.0 km || 
|-id=952 bgcolor=#d6d6d6
| 114952 ||  || — || August 23, 2003 || Socorro || LINEAR || KOR || align=right | 3.3 km || 
|-id=953 bgcolor=#fefefe
| 114953 ||  || — || August 23, 2003 || Socorro || LINEAR || NYS || align=right | 1.1 km || 
|-id=954 bgcolor=#d6d6d6
| 114954 ||  || — || August 23, 2003 || Socorro || LINEAR || 3:2 || align=right | 8.4 km || 
|-id=955 bgcolor=#E9E9E9
| 114955 ||  || — || August 23, 2003 || Socorro || LINEAR || — || align=right | 3.9 km || 
|-id=956 bgcolor=#fefefe
| 114956 ||  || — || August 23, 2003 || Socorro || LINEAR || V || align=right | 1.5 km || 
|-id=957 bgcolor=#fefefe
| 114957 ||  || — || August 23, 2003 || Socorro || LINEAR || NYS || align=right | 1.4 km || 
|-id=958 bgcolor=#E9E9E9
| 114958 ||  || — || August 23, 2003 || Socorro || LINEAR || INO || align=right | 2.2 km || 
|-id=959 bgcolor=#fefefe
| 114959 ||  || — || August 23, 2003 || Socorro || LINEAR || — || align=right | 1.7 km || 
|-id=960 bgcolor=#d6d6d6
| 114960 ||  || — || August 23, 2003 || Socorro || LINEAR || — || align=right | 4.4 km || 
|-id=961 bgcolor=#E9E9E9
| 114961 ||  || — || August 23, 2003 || Socorro || LINEAR || — || align=right | 2.9 km || 
|-id=962 bgcolor=#E9E9E9
| 114962 ||  || — || August 23, 2003 || Socorro || LINEAR || — || align=right | 3.9 km || 
|-id=963 bgcolor=#fefefe
| 114963 ||  || — || August 23, 2003 || Socorro || LINEAR || FLO || align=right | 1.2 km || 
|-id=964 bgcolor=#d6d6d6
| 114964 ||  || — || August 23, 2003 || Socorro || LINEAR || EOS || align=right | 5.2 km || 
|-id=965 bgcolor=#E9E9E9
| 114965 ||  || — || August 23, 2003 || Socorro || LINEAR || — || align=right | 3.1 km || 
|-id=966 bgcolor=#fefefe
| 114966 ||  || — || August 23, 2003 || Socorro || LINEAR || NYS || align=right | 1.5 km || 
|-id=967 bgcolor=#E9E9E9
| 114967 ||  || — || August 23, 2003 || Socorro || LINEAR || EUN || align=right | 2.5 km || 
|-id=968 bgcolor=#d6d6d6
| 114968 ||  || — || August 23, 2003 || Socorro || LINEAR || — || align=right | 6.6 km || 
|-id=969 bgcolor=#d6d6d6
| 114969 ||  || — || August 23, 2003 || Socorro || LINEAR || HYG || align=right | 8.0 km || 
|-id=970 bgcolor=#fefefe
| 114970 ||  || — || August 23, 2003 || Socorro || LINEAR || — || align=right | 1.8 km || 
|-id=971 bgcolor=#d6d6d6
| 114971 ||  || — || August 23, 2003 || Socorro || LINEAR || KOR || align=right | 3.2 km || 
|-id=972 bgcolor=#E9E9E9
| 114972 ||  || — || August 23, 2003 || Socorro || LINEAR || — || align=right | 3.3 km || 
|-id=973 bgcolor=#fefefe
| 114973 ||  || — || August 23, 2003 || Socorro || LINEAR || — || align=right | 1.6 km || 
|-id=974 bgcolor=#d6d6d6
| 114974 ||  || — || August 23, 2003 || Socorro || LINEAR || — || align=right | 6.0 km || 
|-id=975 bgcolor=#E9E9E9
| 114975 ||  || — || August 23, 2003 || Socorro || LINEAR || GEF || align=right | 2.9 km || 
|-id=976 bgcolor=#E9E9E9
| 114976 ||  || — || August 23, 2003 || Socorro || LINEAR || — || align=right | 3.0 km || 
|-id=977 bgcolor=#E9E9E9
| 114977 ||  || — || August 23, 2003 || Socorro || LINEAR || GEF || align=right | 3.2 km || 
|-id=978 bgcolor=#d6d6d6
| 114978 ||  || — || August 23, 2003 || Socorro || LINEAR || — || align=right | 9.5 km || 
|-id=979 bgcolor=#E9E9E9
| 114979 ||  || — || August 23, 2003 || Socorro || LINEAR || CLO || align=right | 3.5 km || 
|-id=980 bgcolor=#d6d6d6
| 114980 ||  || — || August 23, 2003 || Socorro || LINEAR || — || align=right | 7.3 km || 
|-id=981 bgcolor=#E9E9E9
| 114981 ||  || — || August 23, 2003 || Palomar || NEAT || — || align=right | 2.1 km || 
|-id=982 bgcolor=#fefefe
| 114982 ||  || — || August 25, 2003 || Palomar || NEAT || ERI || align=right | 4.1 km || 
|-id=983 bgcolor=#fefefe
| 114983 ||  || — || August 22, 2003 || Socorro || LINEAR || NYS || align=right | 1.1 km || 
|-id=984 bgcolor=#E9E9E9
| 114984 ||  || — || August 22, 2003 || Socorro || LINEAR || — || align=right | 3.5 km || 
|-id=985 bgcolor=#fefefe
| 114985 ||  || — || August 23, 2003 || Socorro || LINEAR || — || align=right | 1.8 km || 
|-id=986 bgcolor=#E9E9E9
| 114986 ||  || — || August 24, 2003 || Socorro || LINEAR || GER || align=right | 2.3 km || 
|-id=987 bgcolor=#d6d6d6
| 114987 Tittel ||  ||  || August 26, 2003 || Piszkéstető || K. Sárneczky, B. Sipőcz || THM || align=right | 4.6 km || 
|-id=988 bgcolor=#E9E9E9
| 114988 ||  || — || August 24, 2003 || Socorro || LINEAR || — || align=right | 5.9 km || 
|-id=989 bgcolor=#E9E9E9
| 114989 ||  || — || August 24, 2003 || Socorro || LINEAR || — || align=right | 6.1 km || 
|-id=990 bgcolor=#fefefe
| 114990 Szeidl ||  ||  || August 26, 2003 || Piszkéstető || K. Sárneczky, B. Sipőcz || — || align=right | 1.3 km || 
|-id=991 bgcolor=#E9E9E9
| 114991 Balázs ||  ||  || August 26, 2003 || Piszkéstető || K. Sárneczky, B. Sipőcz || HOF || align=right | 4.6 km || 
|-id=992 bgcolor=#fefefe
| 114992 ||  || — || August 20, 2003 || Bergisch Gladbach || W. Bickel || — || align=right | 1.4 km || 
|-id=993 bgcolor=#fefefe
| 114993 ||  || — || August 24, 2003 || Bergisch Gladbach || W. Bickel || FLO || align=right | 1.0 km || 
|-id=994 bgcolor=#E9E9E9
| 114994 ||  || — || August 23, 2003 || Socorro || LINEAR || — || align=right | 2.1 km || 
|-id=995 bgcolor=#d6d6d6
| 114995 ||  || — || August 25, 2003 || Palomar || NEAT || — || align=right | 4.7 km || 
|-id=996 bgcolor=#fefefe
| 114996 ||  || — || August 23, 2003 || Palomar || NEAT || — || align=right | 2.6 km || 
|-id=997 bgcolor=#d6d6d6
| 114997 ||  || — || August 24, 2003 || Socorro || LINEAR || 3:2 || align=right | 11 km || 
|-id=998 bgcolor=#fefefe
| 114998 ||  || — || August 24, 2003 || Socorro || LINEAR || — || align=right | 1.6 km || 
|-id=999 bgcolor=#E9E9E9
| 114999 ||  || — || August 24, 2003 || Socorro || LINEAR || — || align=right | 3.5 km || 
|-id=000 bgcolor=#d6d6d6
| 115000 ||  || — || August 24, 2003 || Socorro || LINEAR || — || align=right | 7.4 km || 
|}

References

External links 
 Discovery Circumstances: Numbered Minor Planets (110001)–(115000) (IAU Minor Planet Center)

0114